= Emmer-Compascuum =

- Village
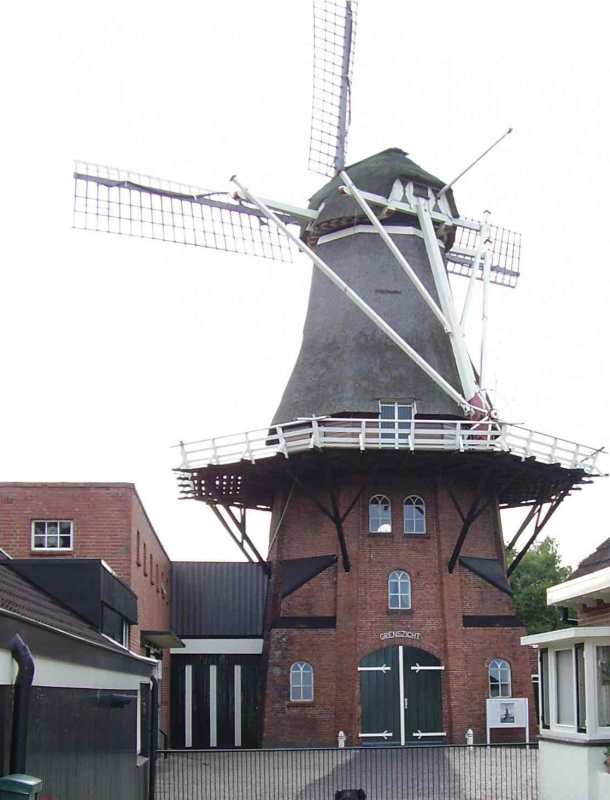
- Grenszicht in Emmer-Compascuum

- Location in province of Drenthe in the Netherlands Emmer-Compascuum (Netherlands)
- Coordinates: 52.8117°N 7.0387°E
- Country: Netherlands
- Province: Drenthe
- Municipality: Emmen
- Established: 1879

Area
  - Total: 39.31 km^{2} (15.18 sq mi)
- Elevation: 17 m (56 ft)

Population (2021)
  - Total: 7,690
  - Density: 196/km^{2} (507/sq mi)
- Time zone: UTC+1 (CET)
  - Summer (DST): UTC+2 (CEST)
- Postal code: 7881
- Dialing code: 0591

Emmer-Compascuum is a village in the Netherlands and is part of the Emmen municipality in Drenthe.

Emmer-Compascuum is located in the Bourtange moor between Germany and the Netherlands. It was originally a compascuum (common pasture). In 1879, Emmer-Compascuum was established. Emmer-Compascuum is often referred as Emmer-Compas by locals.

== Background ==
The Bourtange moor, a large raised bog, formed the border between the Netherlands and Germany. It was an inhospitable uninhabited area which was dissected by the Runde River. The shepherds from both Ober- and Niederlangen in Germany and Noord- and Zuidbarge in the Netherlands used the heath for their sheep.

There was disagreement about the ownership, and a compascuum (common pasture) was agreed. The shepherds from both sides could use the land, but no permanent settlement was allowed. The compascuum did not solve the problem, and there were several large-scale fights between the Dutch and German farmers. In the 1824 Treaty of Meppen, the border was set, however the compascuum remained in effect until 1866 when permanent settlement was allowed in the moorland.

== History ==
In 1874, Emmen sold the compascuum for peat excavation. Between 1878 and 1880, the city of Groningen dug the Stads-Compascuumkanaal from Ter Apel, and the village of Emmer-Compascuum was founded in 1879 at the meeting point of the canal and the Runde River. In 1907, the gristmill Grenszicht was moved from Oude Pekela to Emmer-Compascuum. In 1932, it was home to 2,967 people.

In 1947, ENKA opened a nylon factory in Emmer-Compascuum. At the height of its success, it employed 5,000 people. Other factories like NPBI, a producer of sterile fluid for the pharmaceutical industry, followed.

== Notable people ==
- Seine Middeljans (born 1945), former football player for G.V.A.V in the Eredivisie.
- Annemarie Kremer (born 1974), an operatic soprano

== Gallery ==
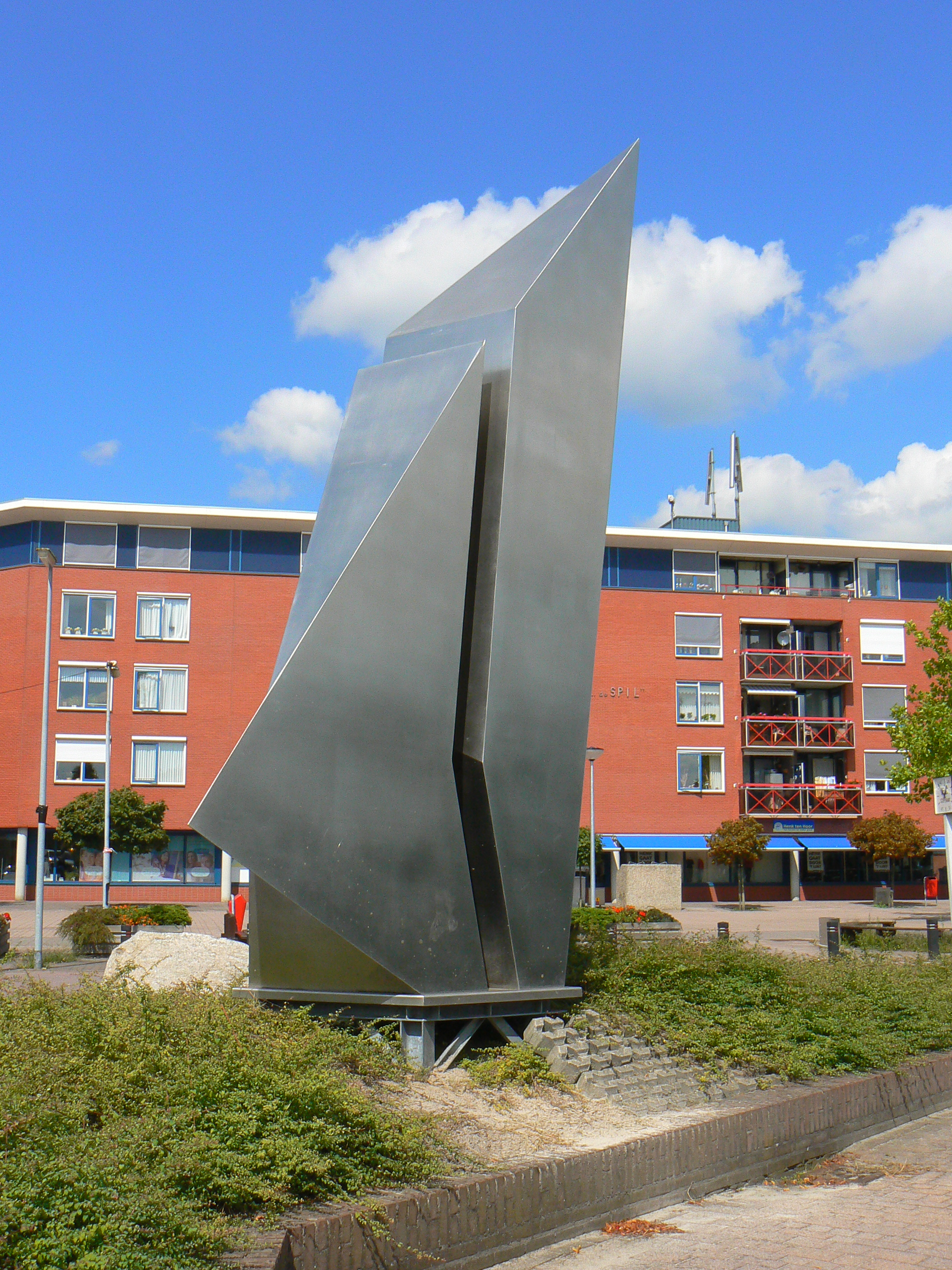
Sculpture in Emmer-Compascuum

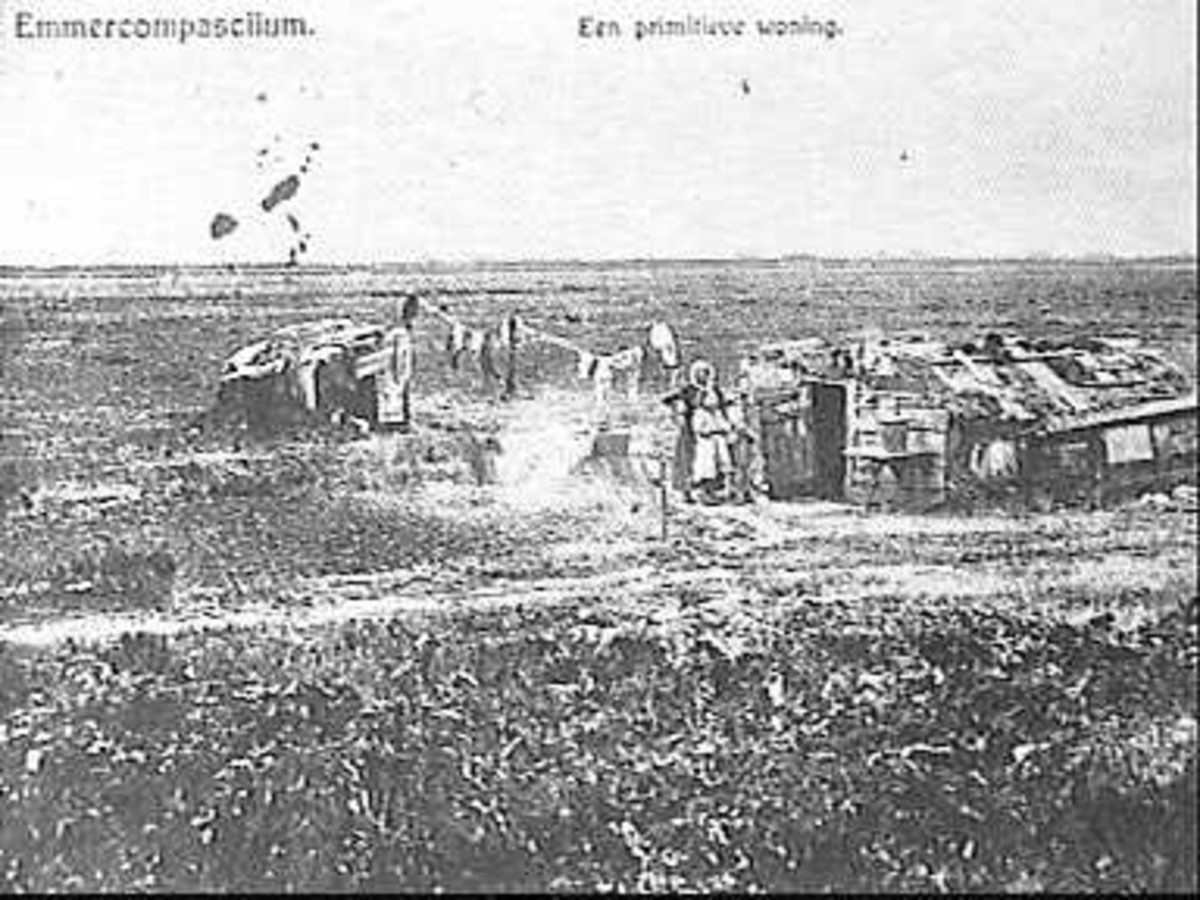
Sod house on the heath (low res)

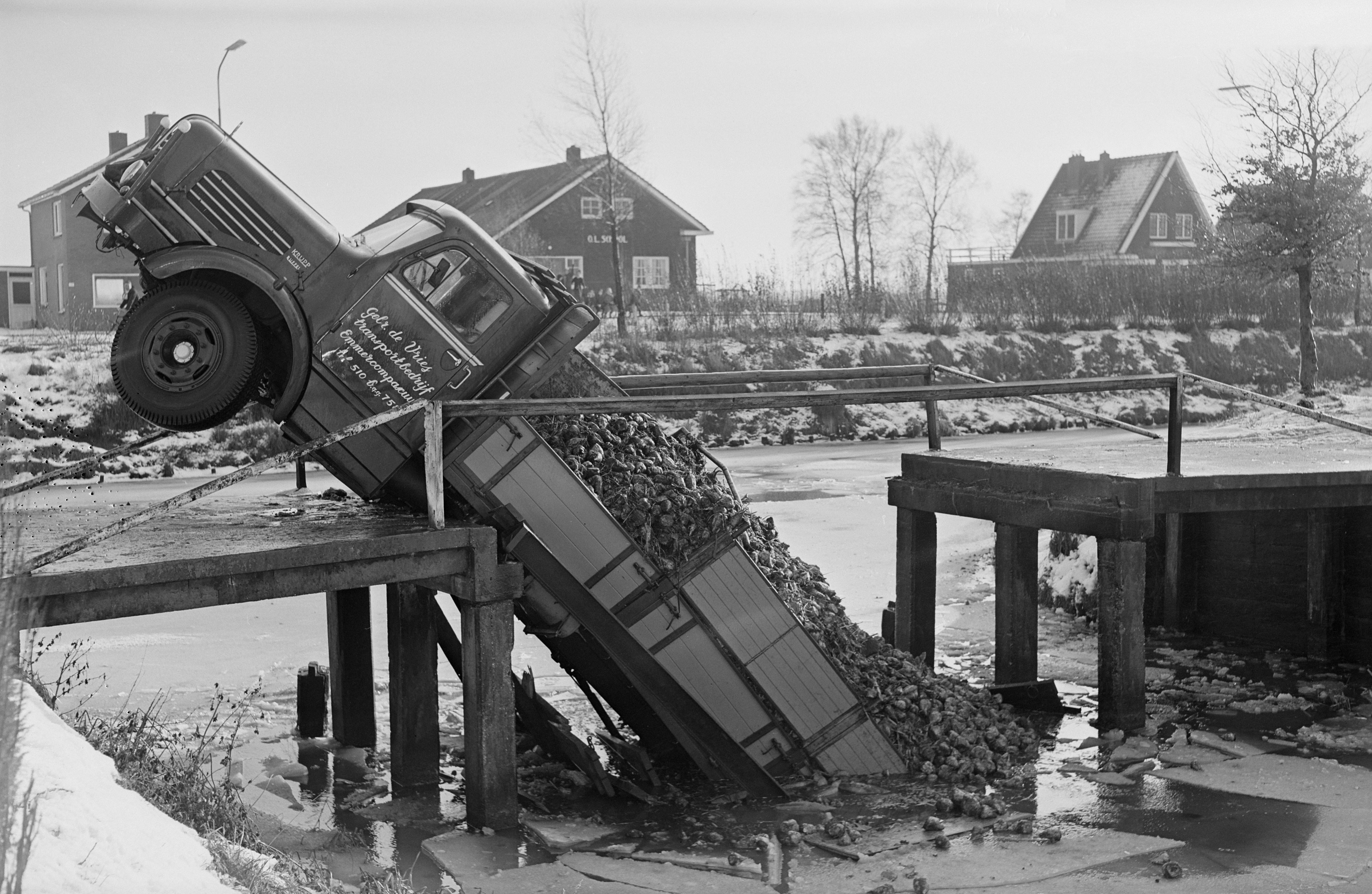
Collapsed bridge (1965)
