= Barger-Compascuum =

- Village
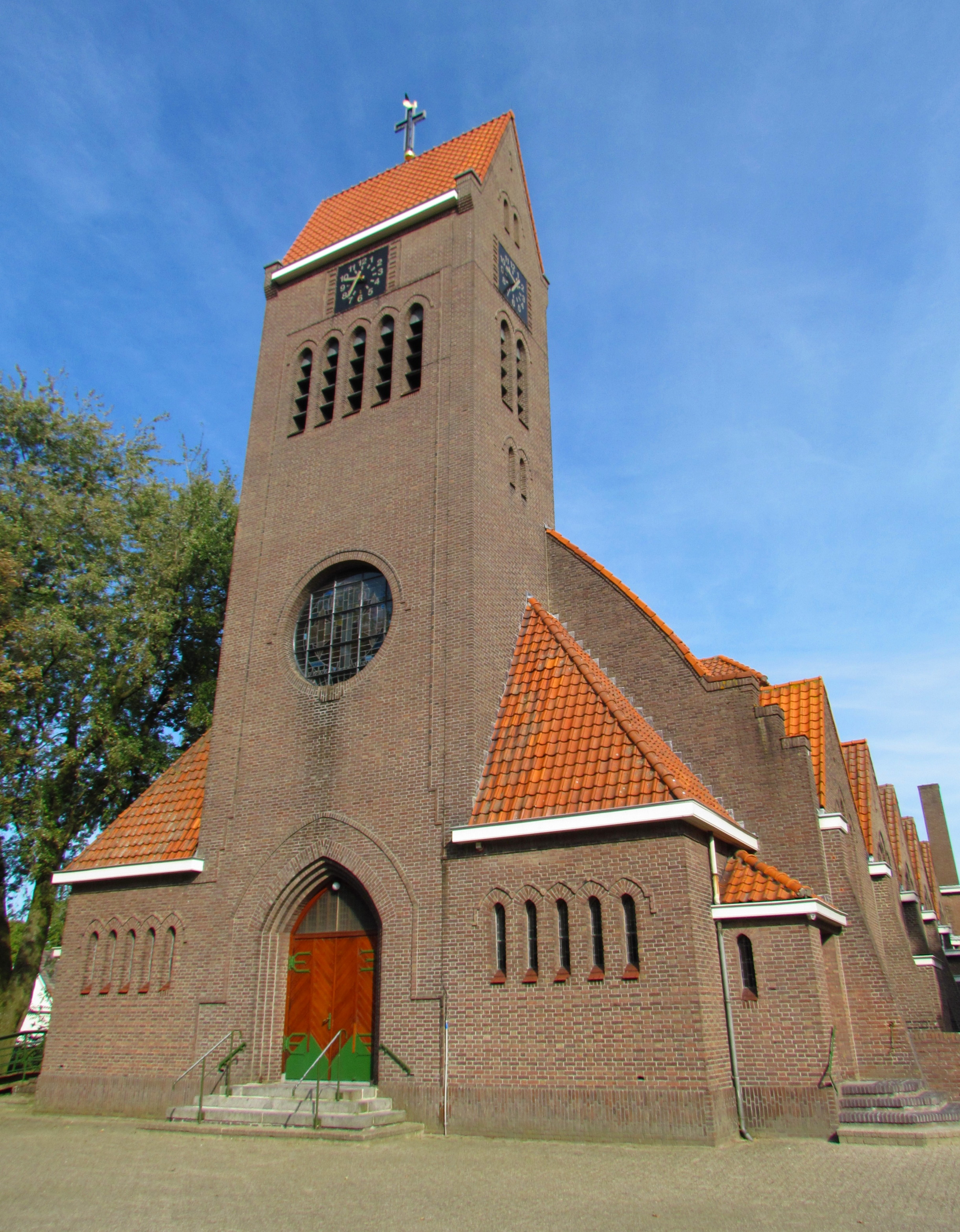
- Saint Joseph Church in Barger-Compascuum

- Location in province of Drenthe in the Netherlands Barger-Compascuum (Netherlands)
- Coordinates: 52.7531°N 7.0402°E
- Country: Netherlands
- Province: Drenthe
- Municipality: Emmen
- Established: 1866

Area
  - Total: 25.09 km^{2} (9.69 sq mi)
- Elevation: 17 m (56 ft)

Population (2021)
  - Total: 1,925
  - Density: 76.72/km^{2} (198.7/sq mi)
- Time zone: UTC+1 (CET)
  - Summer (DST): UTC+2 (CEST)
- Postal code: 7884
- Dialing code: 0591
- Website: barger-compascuum.com

Barger-Compascuum is a village in the Dutch municipality of Emmen. It is in a peat-producing region of Drenthe. Veenpark, an open-air museum, is dedicated to the peat history of the region.

Borger-Compascuum is located in the Bourtange moor between Germany and the Netherlands. It was originally a compascuum (common pasture). In 1866, Barger-Compascuum was established, and the area was permanently inhabited. Barger-Compascuum is often referred as Barger-Compas or Compas by locals.

== Background ==
The Bourtange moor, a large raised bog, formed the border between the Netherlands and Germany. It was an inhospitable uninhabited area which was dissected by the Runde River. The shepherds from both Ober- and Niederlangen in Germany and Noord- and Zuidbarge in the Netherlands used the heath for their sheep.

There was disagreement about the ownership, and a compascuum (common pasture) was agreed. The shepherds from both sides could use the land, but no permanent settlement was allowed. The compascuum did not solve the problem, and there were several large-scale fights between the Dutch and German farmers. In the 1824 Treaty of Meppen, the border was set, however the compascuum remained in effect until 1866 when permanent settlement was allowed in the moorland.

== History ==
On 23 July 1866, the village of Barger-Compascuum was founded. The first settlers were mainly farmers from Hannover who started to dig the canals, excavate the peat, and plant buckwheat. A linear settlement was built along the canals, and many people lived in sod houses. In 1872, a Catholic church was built, and a parish was established. Between 1923 and 1925, it was replaced with the current church. The systematic cultivation of the area started in the 1910s.

== Sights ==
In 1966, Veenpark, an open-air museum dedicated to the peat history of the region, was opened. It contains a sod house village, a windmill and a clog factory.

In 1983, the smock mill De Berk was moved to Barger-Compascuum. The mill was originally located in Drantum.

In 2001, a pump organ museum opened in the Veenpark, and contains a collection of 250 pump organs.

== Notable people ==
- Ben Feringa (born 1951), synthetic organic chemist, 2016 Nobel Prize in Chemistry
- Albert Hermelink Gentiaras (1898–1983), clergyman and bishop of Tanjungkarang

== Gallery ==
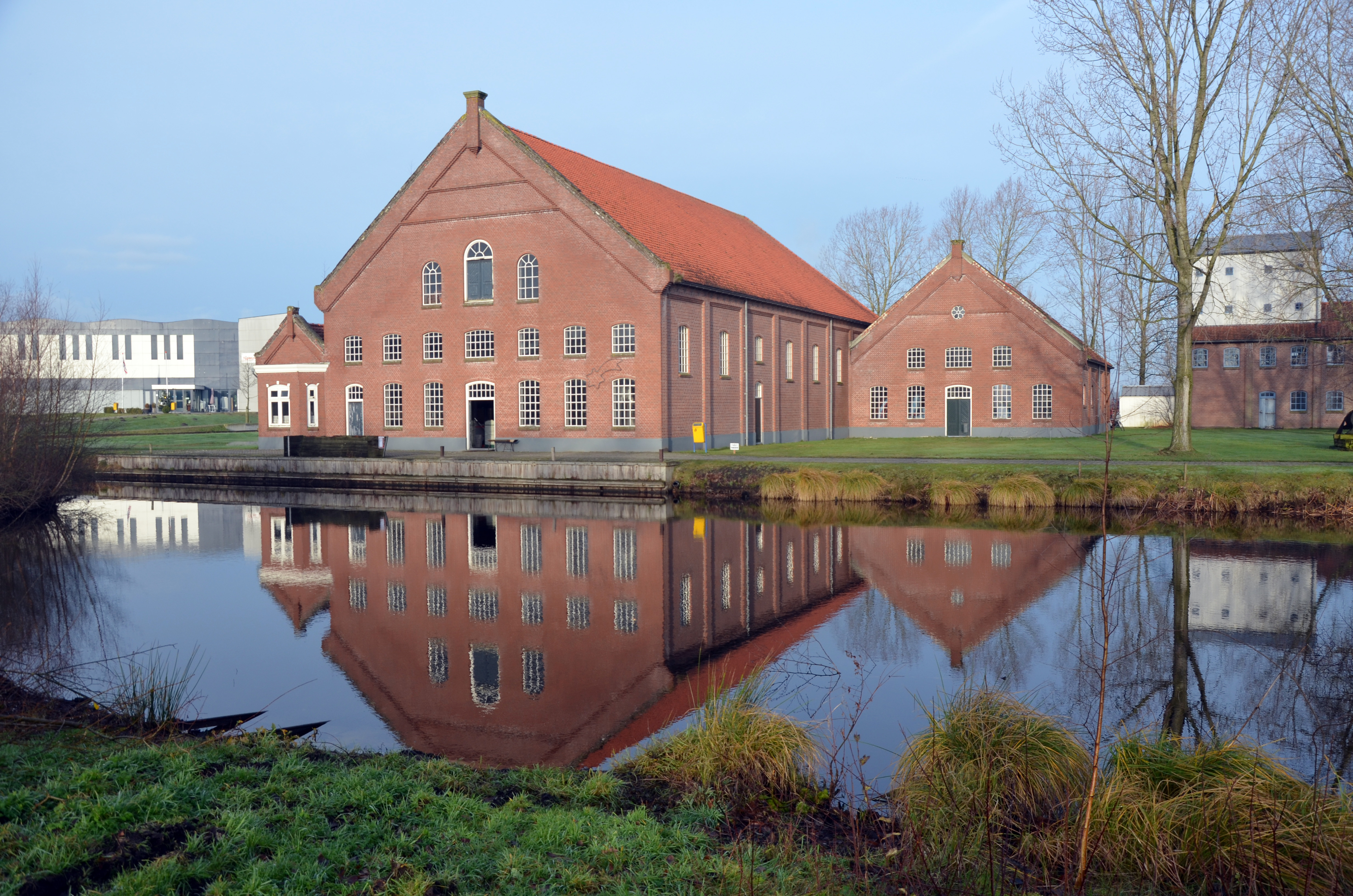
Potato starch factory

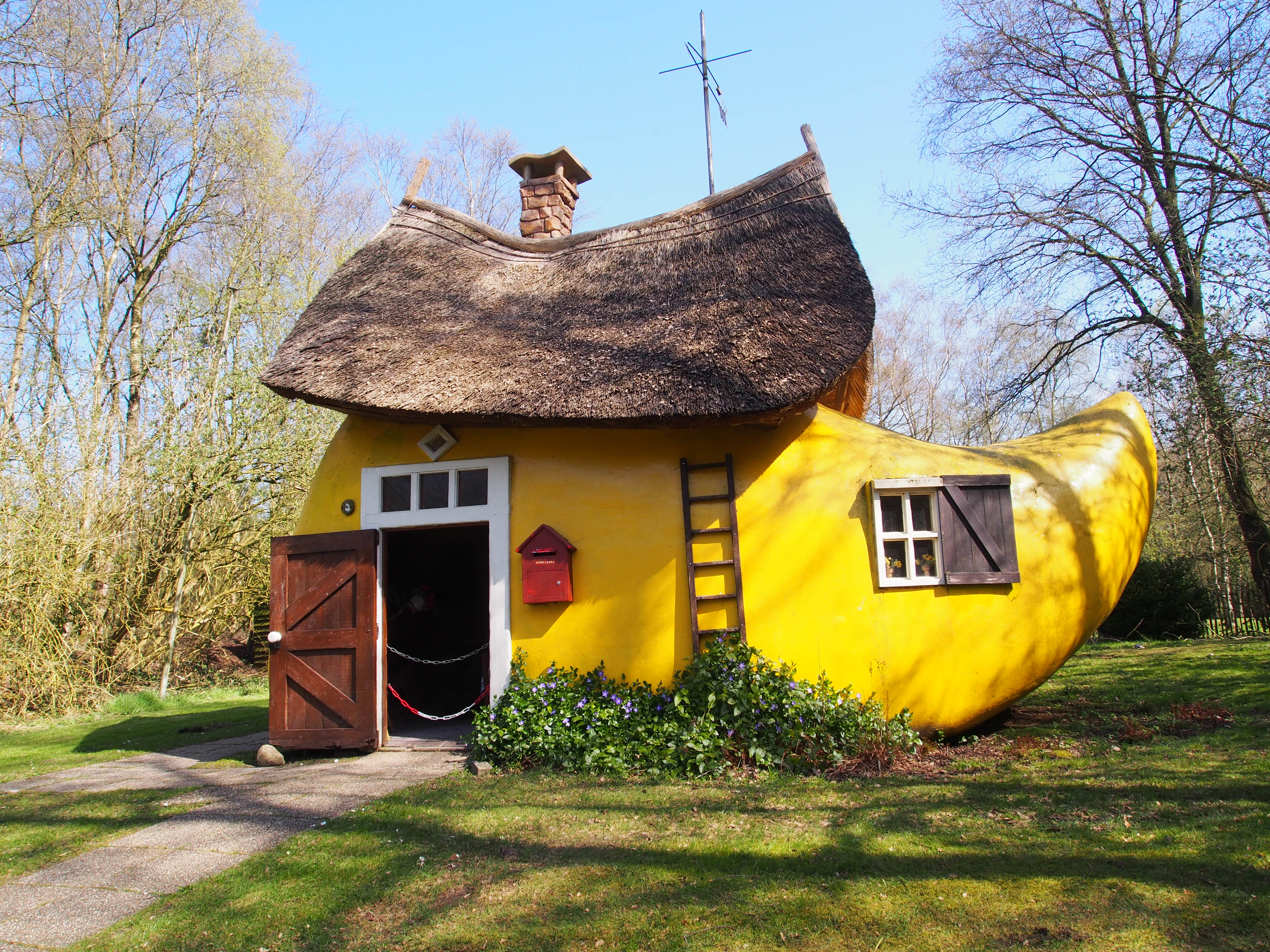
The clog house in Veenpark

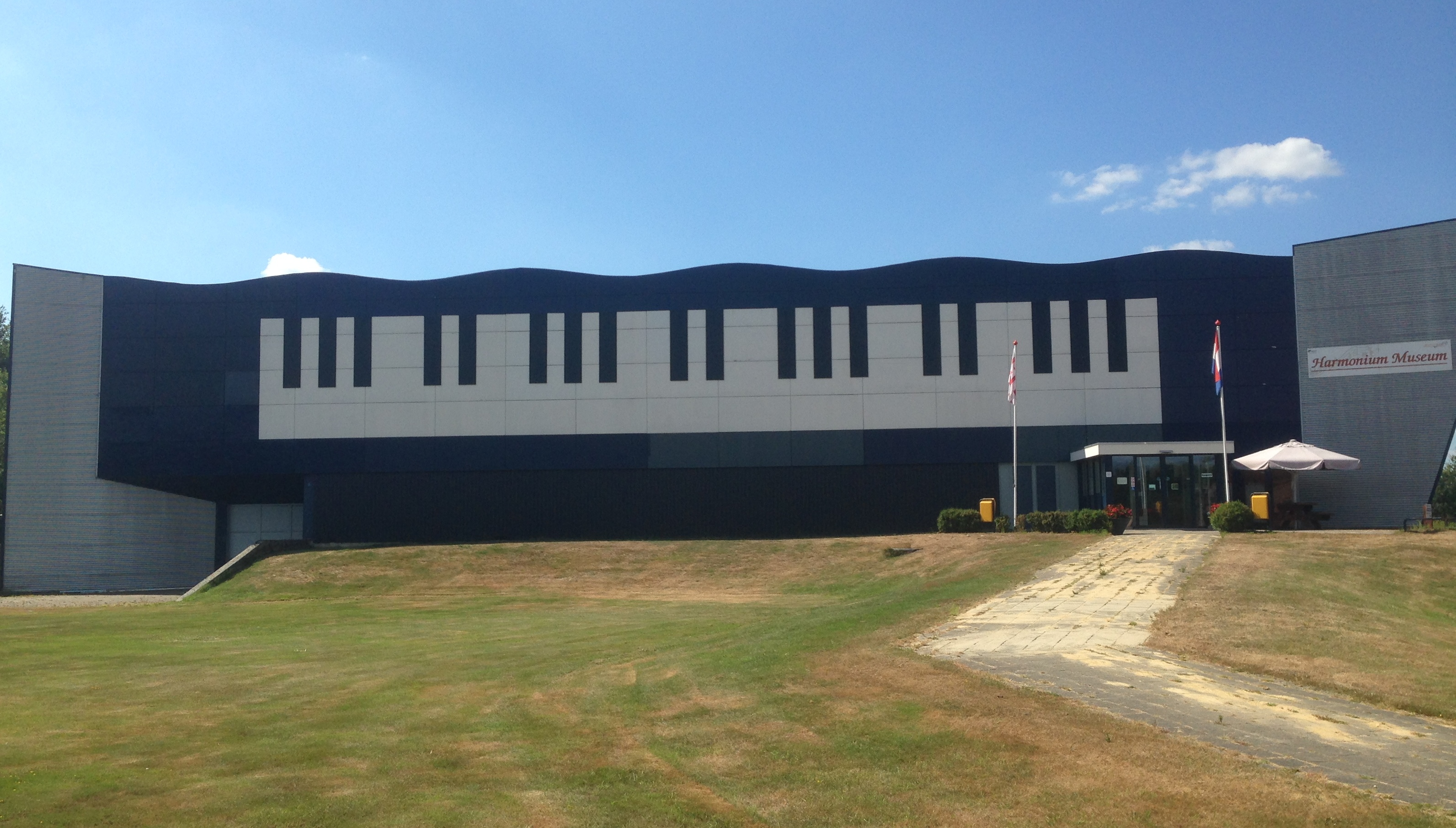
Pump organ museum

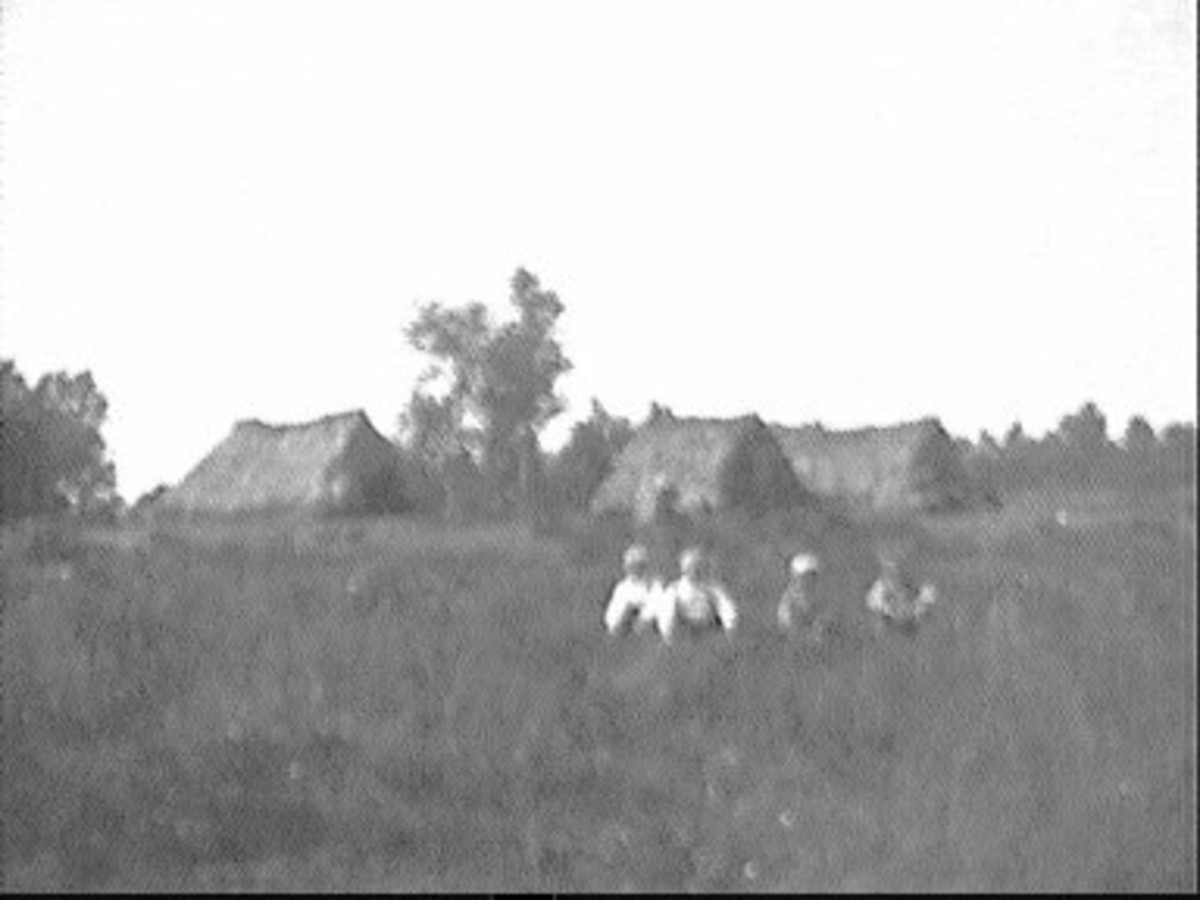
Children in the heath with sod houses
