= Barger =

Barger may refer to:

As a last name:

- Addison Barger (born 1999), American baseball player
- Amy Barger (born 1971), American astronomer
- Carl Barger, baseball executive
- Christine Barger, American actress
- Cy Barger, baseball player
- Frank Barger, American football coach
- George Barger (1878–1939), British chemist
- Jorn Barger, American blogger
- Kathryn Barger, American politician
- Mary Elizabeth Ryan "Toots" Barger (1913–1998), American duckpin bowler
- Ralph H. Barger (1923–2002), an American politician
- Sonny Barger, Hells Angel
- Thomas Barger (1909–1986), American geologist
- Vernon Barger (born 1938), American theoretical physicist
- Maud Barger-Wallach, American tennis player

Also:

- Barger-Oosterveld
- Barger-Compascuum
- Barger-Erfscheidenveen
- Barger-Oosterveen
- R v Barger

== See also ==
- Bargeres
