= Bargery =

Bargery is a surname. Notable people with the surname include:

- George Percy Bargery (1876–1966), English missionary and linguist
- Nadine Dorries, née Nadine Bargery (born 1957), British politician and author

== See also ==
- Barger
