= Maria Irena Mileska =

Polish geographer, war resister (1908–1988)

- Born: Maria Irena Książek; 17 November 1908; Kraków
- Died: 19 September 1988 (aged 79); Kraków
- Education: Jagiellonian University; University of Warsaw
- Occupations: geographer war resister educator
- Known for: Warsaw Uprising

Maria Irena Mileska (maiden name Książek), pseudonym Jaga (17 November 1908 in Kraków – 19 September 1988 in Kraków) was a Polish educator, lieutenant of the underground Polish Home Army, scoutmaster and doctor of geography. She was a war resister during World War II, took part in the 1944 Warsaw Uprising. She was interred in German prisoner-of-war camps and became commander of the women imprisoned with her there.

== Biography ==
Mileska passed her final exams in May 1927 and graduated from the Queen Wanda State Girls' High School in Kraków.

In 1932, she graduated in geography from Jagiellonian University and became a teacher. She joined the Scouts in 1919 and became a commander of the Kraków banner for the Polish Scouting and Guiding Association (Związek Harcerstwa Polskiego (ZHP)). In addition, she was a member of the Polish Tatra Society. In 1933, she married the lawyer Witold Mileski, but in January 1940, he was arrested by the German Gestapo and disappeared, apparently murdered.

=== Resister ===
During the German occupation of Poland (1939–1945), Mileska (codenamed Jaga) was active in the underground Polish scouting movement and in the Polish Women's Military Service. She organized and taught secret classes at the J. Popielewska and J. Roszkowska Gymnasium and the J. Statkowska Commercial High School.

Beginning in 1943, she was a communications officer of the Warsaw District of the Polish Home Army (WSK) and participated in the failed Warsaw Uprising on 2 October 1944. With the uprising's collapse, she was taken captive by the German army. She was given the rank of lieutenant by the WSK, which was the equivalent to an army commandant and was appointed by the Polish Home Army as the commandant of women prisoners of war (POW). She was imprisoned in the Stalag XI B Fallingbostel and Stalag VI C Oberlangen camps in Germany. Initially, she took command informally of the women imprisoned with her but later, with the approval of the German officers overseeing the camp, she took on that role in an official capacity.

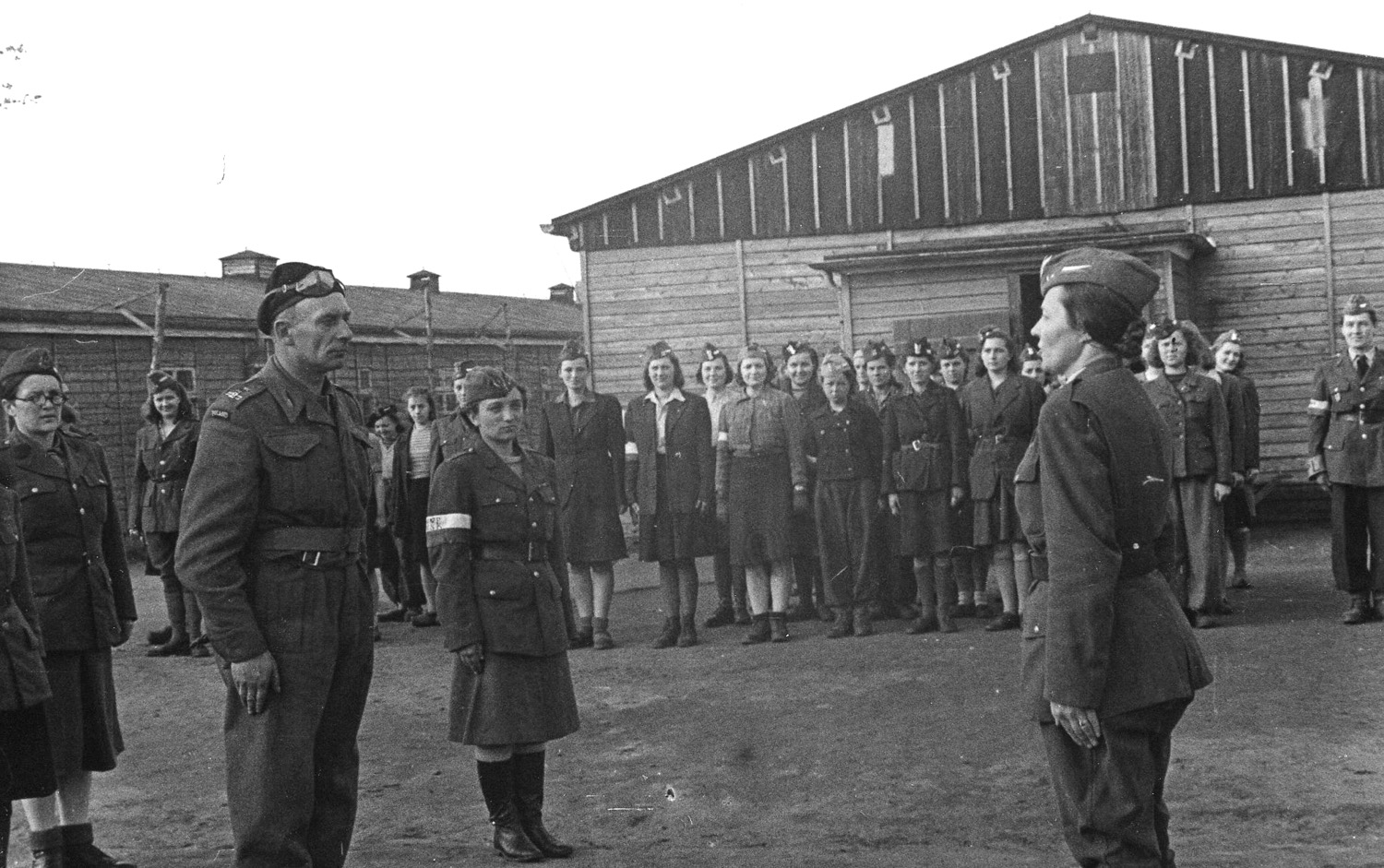
Liberation of Stalag VI C Oberlangen by soldiers of the 1st Polish Armored Division. Report submitted by Lieutenant Maria Irena Mileska "Jaga".

As commander of the imprisoned women, she created a junior high school curriculum for fellow prisoners and even arranged for 120 participants to earn secondary school certificates. On 12 April 1945, the camp of 1,728 women was liberated by the 1st Polish Armored Division. Soon she was commanding the Home Army Women's Soldiers' Camp, renamed Military Center No. 102. Later she was transferred to Niederlangen, Germany. From October 1946 to May 1947, she was assigned to the Historical Office at the 1st Polish Armored Division's Historical Office to organize field reports from the September campaign. It wasn't until 23 July 1947, that she returned to her native Poland.

=== Educator ===
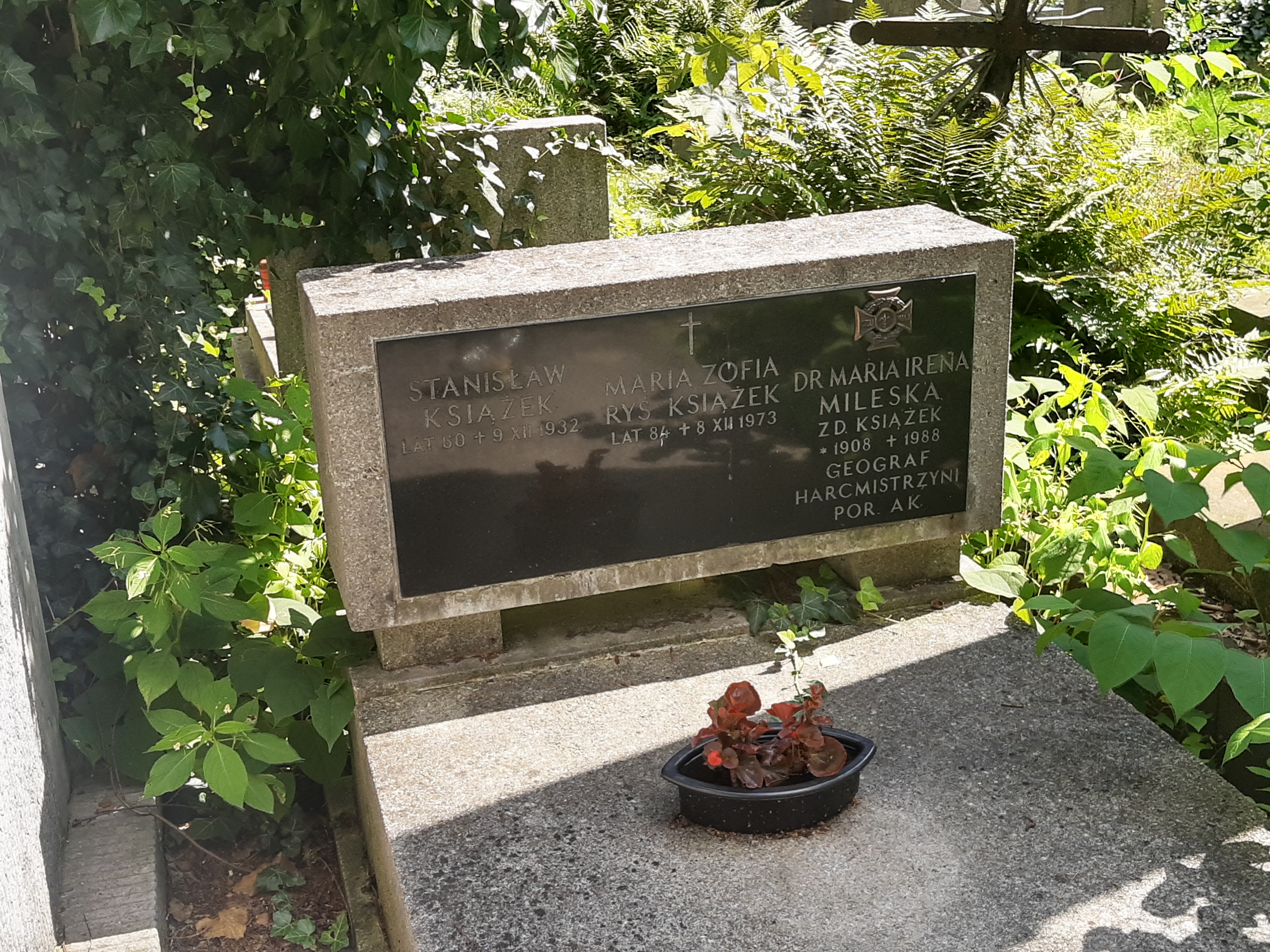
Grave of Maria Irena Mileska at Rakowice Cemetery.

After the War, Mileska dealt with nature conservation in the Tatra Mountains. At the same time, as a volunteer assistant to geographer Stanisław Leszczycki, she helped organize the Department of Anthropogeography at the University of Warsaw. Her work began with clearing rubble and rebuilding the Czetwertyński-Uruski palace, and then preparing for classes. From Autumn 1948, she began teaching classes at the Department of Anthropogeography, later transformed into the Department of Economic and Social Geography and finally into the Department of Economic Geography of Poland, where she held the positions of senior assistant, assistant professor and senior lecturer. She was active in the Polish Geographical Society and on her initiative, the geographical magazine Poznaj świat resumed post-war publication with Mileska working closely with the editorial board.

She also contributed to the Sightseeing Commission of the Main Board of the Polish Tourist and Sightseeing Society, and then chaired this commission for three terms. On 18 June 1962, she earned her Doctorate of Natural Sciences, granted by the University of Warsaw. In 1973, she retired.

She died 19 September 1988 in Kraków and was buried there at the Rakowice Cemetery.

== Honors and distinctions ==
Silver Cross of Merit with Swords

- Silver Cross of Merit with Swords
- Cross of Valor
- Golden Badge of PTTK
- A. Janowski Medal

Mileska also received many other awards, including one granted by the Minister of Higher Education and a few years later by the Minister of Higher Education and Technology, and the title of Meritorious Tourism Activist.

== Selected works ==
- Tourist Regions of Poland (Warsaw, 1963)
- Materials for the history of Kraków female scouts in the years 1911-1939 (Kraków, 2003)
