= Bargeres =

- Neighbourhood
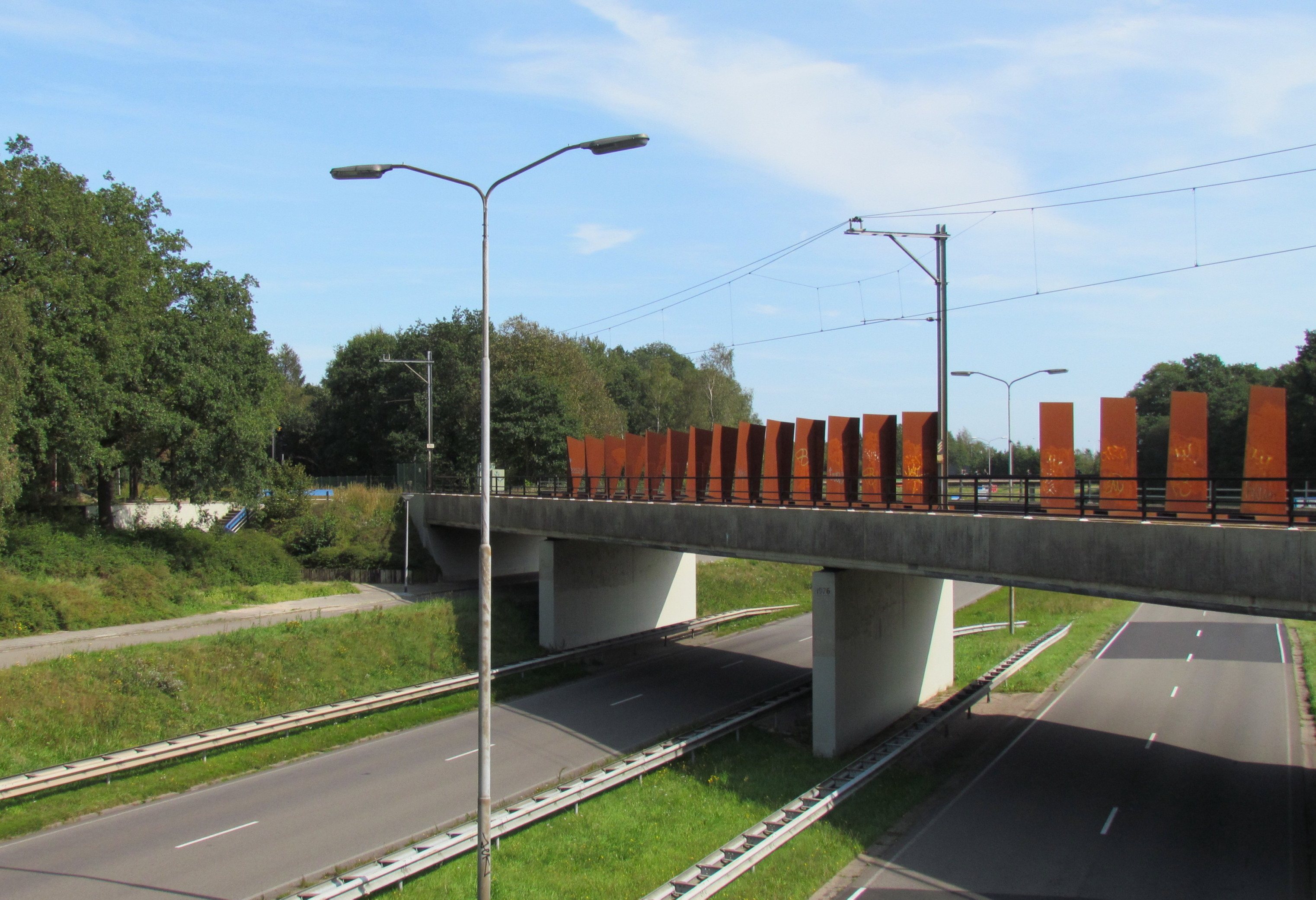
- Former train station of Bargeres

- Location in province of Drenthe in the Netherlands Bargeres (Netherlands)
- Coordinates: 52°46′N 6°52′E
- Country: Netherlands
- Province: Drenthe
- Municipality: Emmen

Area
  - Total: 2.46 km^{2} (0.95 sq mi)
- Elevation: 23 m (75 ft)

Population (2021)
  - Total: 8,850
  - Density: 3,600/km^{2} (9,320/sq mi)
- Time zone: UTC+1 (CET)
  - Summer (DST): UTC+2 (CEST)
- Postal code: 7812
- Dialing code: 0591

Bargeres is a neighbourhood of the city Emmen in Drenthe, the Netherlands.

It was first mentioned in 1486 as "in der marcken unde essche to Berghe unde onder der Clocken to Empne", and means the farmland of Noord- and Zuidbarge. The neighbourhood has been construction in the 1970s and 1980s.
