= Erna de Vries =

German Holocaust survivor and lecturer (1923–2021)

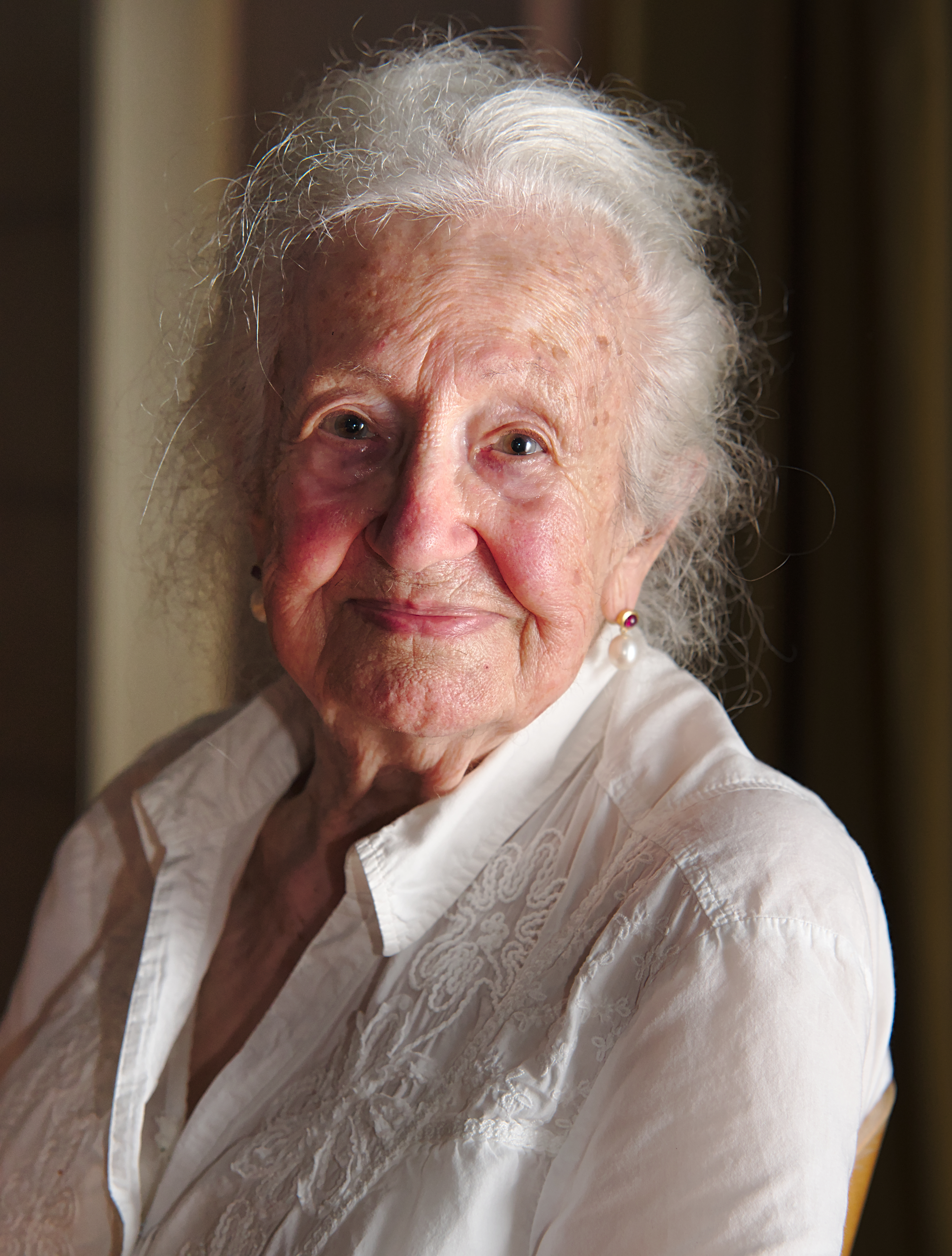
- de Vries in 2018
- Born: Erna Korn; 21 October 1923; Kaiserslautern, Palatinate, Germany
- Died: 24 October 2021 (aged 98); Lathen, Lower Saxony, Germany
- Occupation: Lecturer

Erna de Vries ([ˈɛʁna də ˈvris]; née Erna Korn; 21 October 1923 – 24 October 2021) was a German Holocaust survivor.

After the war she remained in Germany.

In her later years she told her life story in countless schools, other places of learning, in interviews and on television. For her accomplishments, the Federal Republic of Germany awarded her the Order of Merit in 2014.

== Biography ==
Born in 1923, Erna was the daughter of Jakob Korn, a Protestant, and Jeannette Löwenstein, a Jew. According to the Nuremberg Laws, she was considered to be a "half-Jew." Her parents ran a transportation company and she grew up in financial stability. After the death of her father in 1931, her mother ran the company, but was forced to cede it following Adolf Hitler's rise to power. She attended a secondary school run by Franciscan nuns, but her mother pulled her out in 1937 because it became unaffordable and she began attending a public school for Jewish students. After graduation she gave up on her dream of studying medicine and became a seamstress.

On 9 November 1938, Kristallnacht took place, which reached her town of Kaiserslautern the following morning. Korn later stated that she became independent of her mother in that moment, because she realized her mother could no longer help her in the rising tensions. She and her mother took refuge in a Christian cemetery where her father was buried while their house was vandalized. Shortly before World War II, she moved to Cologne to work as a housekeeper for a Jewish family. In early 1941, she began working as a nurse in a hospital in Cologne. During this time, the first Jews in Kaiserslautern were deported to Auschwitz via Gurs internment camp. She returned to her mother because her mother refused to leave Kaiserslautern, but subsequently departed to work as a nurse in Frankfurt. In August 1942, the hospital was dismantled and the workers and patients there were deported.

On 6 July 1943, Korn learned that her mother was soon to be arrested and deported, and demanded to be transferred to Saarbrücken. She learned that her mother would soon be sent to Auschwitz, but still joined her mother. On 23 July 1943, the two women arrived at Auschwitz and were quarantined outdoors for four weeks. She received the number 50 462. She was sent to work on the waterfront and developed fibrosis. Her wounds were discovered on 15 September 1943 and she was sent to be executed in the gas chamber. However, on the day she was to be executed, she and 83 other "half-Jews" were sent to Ravensbrück. At that moment, she left her mother behind at Auschwitz.

At Ravensbrück, Korn found another prisoner she had met at Auschwitz. While working in the kitchen, she offered him extra rations of bread so that he would not starve. In 1944, she began working in a Siemens factory, where she learned from other deportees that her mother had been killed on 8 November 1943. Due to the advance of Allied troops, she was forced into a death march through northern Germany which lasted for eight days. In Mecklenburg, she was finally freed by Allied soldiers and subsequently housed by a farmer while working as a cook. In October 1945, she returned to Cologne to stay with her family. There, she met Josef de Vries, a former Jewish deportee, whom she married in 1947. The couple settled in Lathen. The couple had three children and six grandchildren.

To fulfill her mother's dying wish, de Vries testified in schools and gave lectures. In 1998, she gave her testimony at the United States Holocaust Memorial Museum. In February 2016, she travelled to Detmold to testify against SS guard Reinhold Hanning, who worked at Auschwitz. She made her last public appearance on 12 February 2020 at a Protestant church in Emlichheim.

Erna de Vries died in Lathen on 24 October 2021, three days after her 98th birthday.

== Distinctions ==
- Order of Merit of the Federal Republic of Germany
- Stolperstein at Friedenstraße 30 in Kaiserslautern bearing her and her mother's name

== Books ==
- Der Auftrag meiner Mutter: Eine Überlebende der Shoah erzählt (2011) ISBN 3863310454
