= Stalag VI-B =

German War Camp

Stalag VI-B / Stalag VI-C/Z
- Versen, Lower Saxony
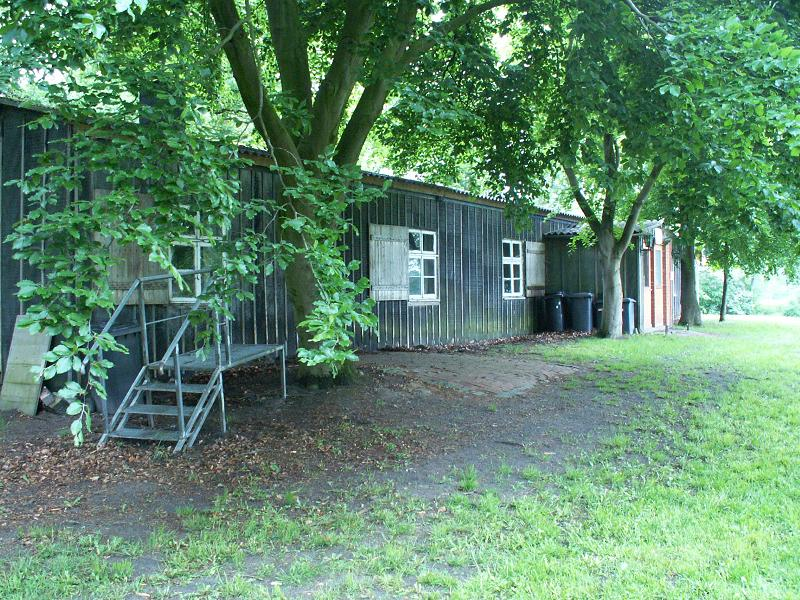
- Barracks hut, 2004

Site information
- Type: Prisoner-of-war camp
- Controlled by: Nazi Germany

Location
- Versen, Germany (pre-war borders, 1937)
- Coordinates: 52.722713°N 7.183608°E

Site history
- In use: 1939–1945

Garrison information
- Occupants: Allied prisoners

Stalag VI-B was a German World War II prisoner-of-war camp (Stammlager), located about 3 km (1.9 mi) east of the village of Versen in the Emsland district of Lower Saxony, in north-western Germany, close to the border with the Netherlands.

== Camp history ==
The camp was established in 1938 as Lager IX Versen, one of the Emslandlager group of labour camps. It was designed to hold up to 1,500 political prisoners, who worked under the direction of the Reichsarbeitsdienst ("State Labor Service") in the local peat bogs. After the outbreak of World War II in September 1939 the camp was taken over by Military District VI, and designated Stalag VI-B, with sub-camps (Zweiglager) — designated Stalag VI-B/Z — a few kilometres away at Oberlangen, Wesuwe and Fullen. On 13 May 1942 Stalag VI-B and its sub-camps all came under the administrative control of Stalag VI-C at Bathorn, and were renamed Stalag VI-C/Z.

The camps of Stalag VI-B were first occupied by prisoners-of-war taken during the invasion of Poland. In early 1940 these were replaced by POW from France and Belgium. In addition, there were Dutch, Polish, and later Russians in the camps. After the armistice of 1943 Italian prisoners arrived.

From November 1944 prisoners from the Neuengamme concentration camp in Hamburg were housed at Versen to work on the Friesenwall, part of the Atlantic Wall between the Netherlands and Denmark.

The camps were abandoned in March 1945, and the prisoners were moved by train or marched east to other camps.

The camp at Versen was used after the war as a prison under the control of the Lower Saxony Ministry of Justice. After a fire in 1972, much of the camp was rebuilt. It currently operates as Justizvollzugsanstalt Meppen ("Meppen Correctional Institution").

== See also ==
- List of prisoner-of-war camps in Germany
- List of subcamps of Neuengamme
