= Arthur Lloyd James =

Welsh phonetician and convicted murderer

Photograph of Arthur Lloyd James, printed in a 1941 issue of the Derby Evening Telegraph

Arthur Lloyd James (21 June 1884 – 24 March 1943) was a Welsh phonetician and convicted murderer who was a professor at the School of Oriental and African Studies and the linguistic adviser to the British Broadcasting Corporation. His research was mainly on the phonetics of English and French, but he also worked on the phonetics of Hausa and Yoruba. He killed himself while a patient at the Broadmoor Criminal Lunatic Asylum, where he was committed after killing his wife, the violinist Elsie Winifred Owen, in 1941.

== Early life ==
Arthur Lloyd James was born on 21 June 1884, in Pentre, Glamorgan, Wales. His parents were William James, manager of a coal mine and a mining engineer, and Rachel James, née Clark. He went to school in Llanelli and then Pontypridd. Lloyd James graduated from University College, Cardiff in 1905, obtaining third-class honours in French. He taught for a few years and then went to Trinity College, Cambridge; his research centred on Old French and Provençal, and he graduated in 1910 with a degree in medieval and modern languages. He taught French and phonetics at Training College, and during World War I served with the Royal Engineers. The surname of his parents is James, but his second given name, Lloyd, a common surname, is often interpreted as part of his own surname, and his publications are frequently cited under Lloyd James. This usage is followed in the present article. However, in the biographical note by his mentor, Daniel Jones, the surname is cited as James.

== Academic employment ==
Lloyd James became a lecturer in phonetics at University College, London in 1920. He became the first head of the School of Oriental Studies department of phonetics in 1927. He became a reader in 1930 and a professor in 1933. From 1924 to 1933, Lloyd James lectured at the Royal Academy of Dramatic Art.

== Research ==
Lloyd James wrote papers on the phonetics of various languages, including Yoruba, Hausa (with George Percival Bargery), Marathi (with S. G. Kanhere), and Pashto (with Georg Morgenstierne).

In his later career Lloyd James worked primarily in applied phonetics, in the 1920s developing standards for the English pronunciation style to be used by announcers on broadcast radio, and in the early 1940s in military telephony. His theoretical phonetic perspective was that language is a system of signals, and in this context he introduced a distinction between "articulation", for consonants, and "modulation", for vowels. In his primer for RAF officers on the importance of clarity of enunciation under service conditions, he pointed out:

In some languages the acoustic difference between Accented Syllables and others is not very considerable. In others it is very considerable indeed; there is a pronounced "punch."

He takes French and Telugu as examples of the former, and English, Arabic and Persian for the latter, using the wartime metaphors of machine gun and Morse code rhythm, respectively, for the benefit of his officer students. An informal formulation shows his didactic approach: "Good rhythm means punching out the accented syllables, keeping them at equal intervals of time apart, and not smothering up the unstressed syllables. It is exactly like good rhythm in a dance band."

== Work with the BBC ==
From 1926 to 1940, Lloyd James was the honorary secretary of the BBC's Advisory Committee on Spoken English and was instrumental in establishing a standard broadcasting pronunciation for British English, familiarly referred to as "BBC English". In 1938, he was given the title of "Linguistic Adviser to the BBC".

== Personal life ==
Arthur Lloyd James's wife was Elsie Winifred (1888/1889–1941). She was the daughter of the musician Luther Owen, and herself was a well known violinist and a fellow of the Royal Academy of Music. They had one child, David Owen Lloyd James.

== Murder and trial ==
In 1941 the stress of World War II led Arthur Lloyd James to kill his wife, fearing the war would otherwise cause her hardship. The murder weapons were a fork and poker.

He was tried at the Central Criminal Court, with Mr. Justice Wrottesley presiding. The prosecutor was Mr. G. B. McClure, and Mr. Richard O'Sullivan, K.C. was the defence. Brixton Prison senior medical officer Dr. H. A. Grierson argued that Lloyd James had manic depressive insanity with a predominant depressive stage. Lloyd James pleaded not guilty; the jury found him guilty but insane.

== Death ==
Arthur Lloyd James killed himself on 24 March 1943, at the Broadmoor Criminal Lunatic Asylum in Crowthorne, Berkshire. He hanged himself with a necktie and scarf from a bar in his cell.

== Selected works ==
- Lloyd James, Arthur (1928). "The Practical Orthography of African Languages". Africa: Journal of the International African Institute. 1 (1): 125–129. doi:10.2307/1155869. JSTOR 1155869.
- Lloyd James, Arthur (1929). "Pronunciation". Encyclopædia Britannica. Vol. 18 (14th ed.). London: The Encyclopædia Britannica Company. pp. 578–580.
- Lloyd James, Arthur (1929). Historical Introduction to French Phonetics. London: University of London Press.
- Lloyd James, Arthur (1935). The Broadcast Word. London: Kegan Paul, Trench and Trubner.
- Lloyd James, Arthur (1928–1939). Broadcast English: Recommendations to Announcers. London: British Broadcasting Corporation.
- Lloyd James, Arthur (1940). Speech Signals in Telephony. London: Sir Isaac Pitman & Sons, Ltd.

=== Edited collections ===
- Collins, Beverly S.; Mees, Inger; Carley, Paul, eds. (2012). English Phonetics: Twentieth-Century Developments. Vol. II: Lloyd James: Broadcasting and Spoken English. Routledge. ISBN 9780415590563.
- Collins, Beverly S.; Mees, Inger; Carley, Paul, eds. (2012). English Phonetics: Twentieth-Century Developments. Vol. III: Lloyd James's Broadcast English. Routledge. ISBN 9780415590570.
