= Grenszicht, Emmer-Compascuum =

Windmill in Emmer-Compascuum, Netherlands

Grenszicht
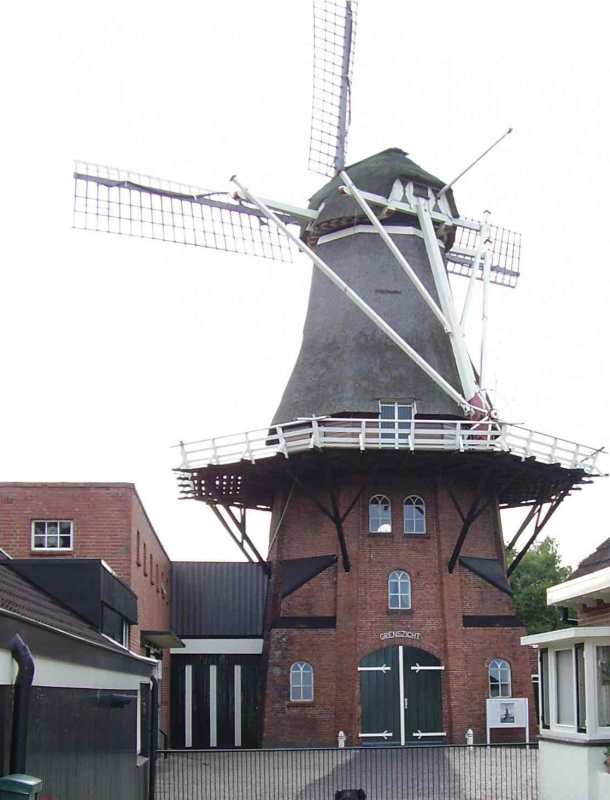
- The mill in February 2008

Origin
- Mill name: Grenszicht; Molen van Geerdink
- Mill location: Hoofdkanal W.Z. 109, 7881 AE, Emmer-Compascuum
- Coordinates: 52°49′16″N 7°03′40″E
- Operator(s): Private
- Year built: 1907

Information
- Purpose: Corn mill
- Type: Smock mill
- Storeys: Three-storey smock
- Base storeys: Four-storey base
- Smock sides: Eight sides
- No. of sails: Four sails
- Type of sails: Common sails
- Windshaft: Cast iron
- Winding: Tailpole and winch
- Auxiliary power: Steam engine, then a 22 horsepower (16 kW) oil engine, then a 25 horsepower (19 kW) electric motor.
- No. of pairs of millstones: Two pairs of Cullen stones
- Size of millstones: 1.40 metres (4 ft 7 in)

Grenszicht (English Border view) or Molen van Geerdink is a smock mill in Emmer-Compascuum, Netherlands. It was built in 1907. The mill is listed as a Rijksmonument, number 14690.

== History ==
Grenszicht was built in 1907 by millwright J H Schulte of Ter Apel, Groningen. It had previously stood at Oude Pekela, Groningen where it had been used as a drainage windmill. A steam engine was used as auxiliary power. It was replaced by a 22 horsepower (16 kW) oil engine. This was replaced in 1941 by a 25 horsepower (19 kW) electric motor. A pair of sails was lost in 1936, and the other pair in 1947. The mill ceased work in 1967. In the winter of 1974–75, the mill was restored by millwright Molema of Scheemda, Groningen. New sails and a new windshaft were fitted, and the mill was re-thatched. The original wooden windshaft was kept as a museum piece. On completion of the restoration, the mill was named "Grenszicht" as it stands close to the Dutch – German border. In 2002, a museum was opened as part of the mill.

== Description ==
Grenszicht is what the Dutch describe as an "achtkante stellingmolen" – a smock mill with a stage. The mill has a four-storey base with a three-storey smock. The stage is at third-floor level and is 8.15 metres (26 ft 9 in) above ground level. The smock and cap are thatched. The cap is winded by a tailpole and winch. The four Common sails, which span 18.80 metres (61 ft 8 in) are carried on a cast-iron windshaft. This was cast in 1928 by millwright H J Koning. The windshaft also carries the brake wheel which has 69 cogs. This drives the wallower (29 cogs) at the top of the upright shaft. At the bottom end of the upright shaft the great spur wheel (81 cogs) drives two lantern pinion stone nuts, of 23 and 26 staves. Each stone nut drives a pair of 1.40 metres (4 ft 7 in) Cullen millstones.

== Public access ==
Grenszicht is open to the public by appointment.
