= Renkenberge =

- Municipality
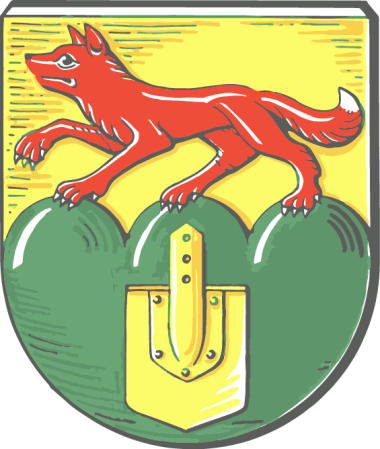
- Coat of arms

- Location of Renkenberge within Emsland district
- Interactive map of Renkenberge
- Location within Germany Location within Lower Saxony
- Coordinates: 52°54′N 07°23′E
- Country: Germany
- State: Lower Saxony
- District: Emsland
- Municipal assoc.: Lathen
- Subdivisions: 2 Ortsteile

Government
  - Mayor: Heinrich Bojer (CDU)

Area
  - Total: 18.98 km^{2} (7.33 sq mi)
- Elevation: 14 m (46 ft)

Population (2025-12-31)
  - Total: 691
  - Density: 36.4/km^{2} (94.3/sq mi)
- Time zone: UTC+01:00 (CET)
  - Summer (DST): UTC+02:00 (CEST)
- Postal codes: 49762
- Dialling codes: 05933
- Vehicle registration: EL
- Website: www.Renkenberge.de

Renkenberge is a municipality in the Emsland district, in Lower Saxony, Germany.
