= Zeldenrust, Zuidbarge =

Dutch windmill

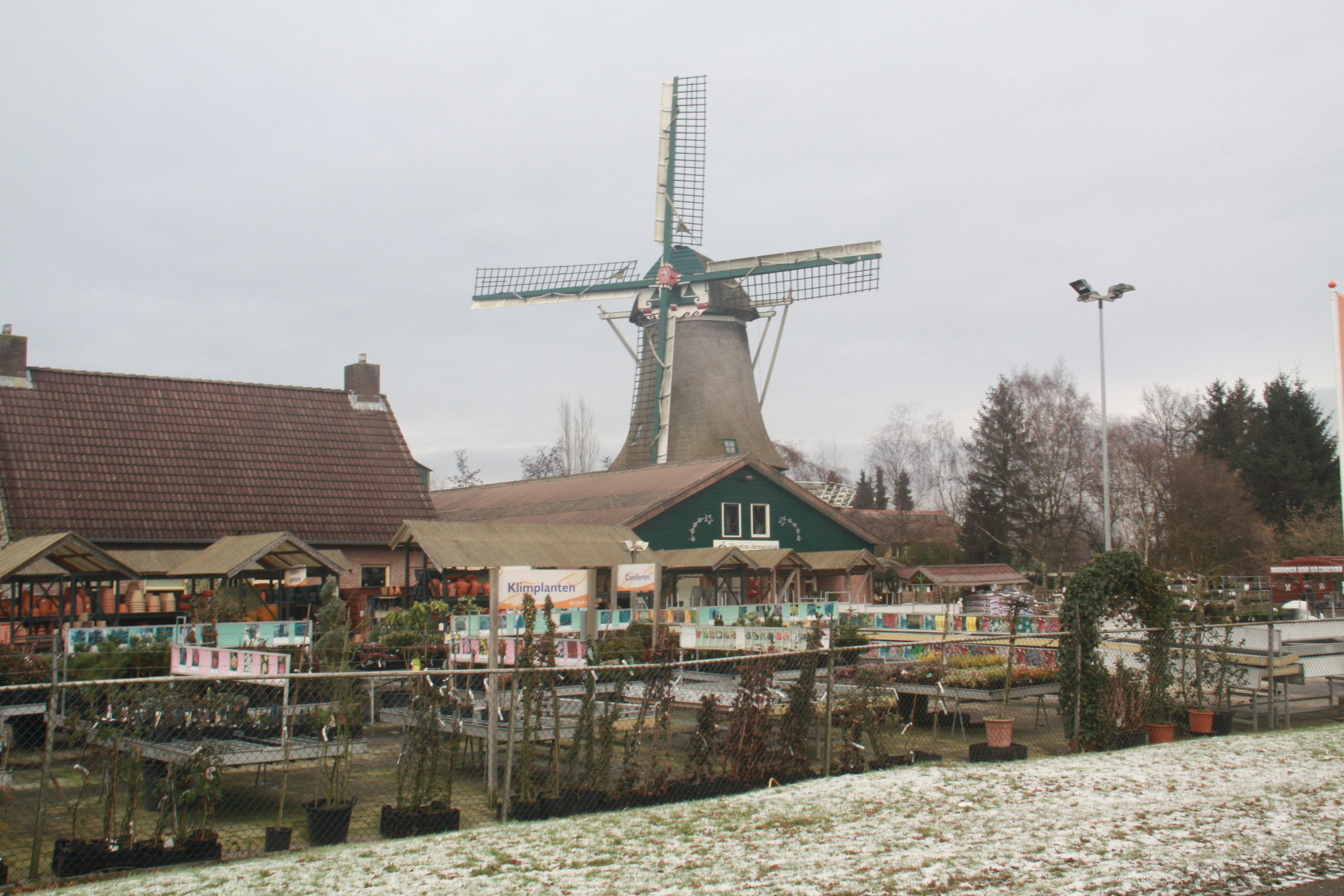
- Zeldenrust, January 2009

Origin
- Mill name: Zeldenrust
- Mill location: Oranjekanaal N.Z. 7, 7825 TK Zuidbarge
- Coordinates: 52°44′57″N 6°54′32″E
- Operator(s): Stichting Molen Zeldenrust
- Year built: 1857

Information
- Purpose: Corn mill
- Type: Smock mill
- Storeys: Three-storey smock
- Base storeys: Three-storey base
- Smock sides: Eight sides
- No. of sails: Four sails
- Type of sails: Common sails, Fok system
- Windshaft: Cast iron
- Winding: Tailpole and winch
- No. of pairs of millstones: One pair
- Size of millstones: 1.50 metres (4 ft 11 in)

Zeldenrust is a smock mill in Zuidbarge, Drenthe, which has been restored to working order. The mill was built in 1857 and is listed as a Rijksmonument, number 14968.

== History ==
Zeldenrust was built in 1857 for miller Roelf Oostling. It was moved from Emmen where it had been used as an oil mill. The mill passed from Roelf Oostling to his son Jans and in 1919 he sold it to Jan Omvlee, who died in 1928 on his 37th birthday, leaving a wife and eight children. The mill passed to his widow Jacoba. In 1936, the leading edges of the sails were streamlined on the Dekker system. In 1946, the mill was taken over by Harm and Johannes Omvlee but it ceased working in 1949. In 1966, the mill was restored by millwright Christiaan Bremer of Adorp, Groningen. New sails on the Fok system were fitted. On 13 November 1972 the mill was damaged in a storm. It was repaired in 1974. In 2001, the mill was sold to the Stichting Molen Zeldenrust. A further restoration was undertaken millwright Doornbosch. The cap and sails were removed on 22 September 2003. The new cap and sails were fitted to the mill on 5 April 2004 and the mill was officially reopened on 10 June 2006. The new sails have leading edges streamlined on the Fauël system.

== Description ==
Zeldenrust is what the Dutch describe as an "achtkante stellingmolen". It is a three-storey smock mill on a three-storey brick base. The stage is at second-floor level, 5.90 metres (19 ft 4 in) above ground level. The smock and cap are thatched. The mill is winded by a tailpole and winch. The four Common sails have a span of 21.50 metres (70 ft 6 in) and are carried in a cast-iron windshaft which was cast by Prins van Oranje, The Hague in 1877. The windshaft also carries the brake wheel which has 64 cogs. This drives the wallower (33 cogs) at the top of the upright shaft. At the bottom of the upright shaft, the great spur wheel, which has 100 cogs, drives the 1.50 metres (4 ft 11 in) diameter French Burr stones via a lantern pinion stone nut with 33 staves.

== Millers ==
- Roelf Oostling (1857- )
- Jans Oostling ( -1919)
- Jan Omvlee (1919–28)
- Jacoba Maria Omvlee-Bekhuis (1928–46)
- Harm Omvlee (1946–49)
- Johannes Omvlee (1946–49)

References for above:-

== Public access ==
Zeldenrust is open to the public Monday to Friday from 09:00 to 18:00.
