= Compascuus =

Compascuus is Latin for commonly grazed, and hence often used in the forms ager compascuus (common pasture land) and compascuum (the common pasture). In the early Roman Republic, there were three kinds of land: private, public and common pasture. The lex agraria of 111 BC, which formalized the existing situation after the land reforms, set limits on how many cattle an individual could graze on ager compascuus without having to pay dues.

== Placenames ==
This ancient term is still preserved in some placenames in Drenthe, because the border between the Netherlands and Germany in the Bourtange moor was not delimited and was a common pasture for shepherds from both sides of the border.

- Barger-Compascuum
- Emmer-Compascuum
