= Sustrum =

- Municipality
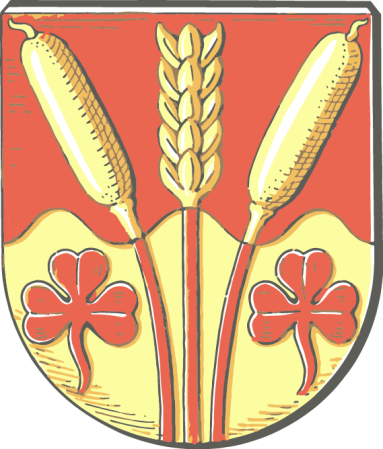
- Coat of arms

- Location of Sustrum within Emsland district
- Interactive map of Sustrum
- Location within Germany Location within Lower Saxony
- Coordinates: 52°55′N 07°16′E
- Country: Germany
- State: Lower Saxony
- District: Emsland
- Municipal assoc.: Lathen
- Subdivisions: 3 Ortsteile

Government
  - Mayor: Heinz-Hermann Hoppe (CDU)

Area
  - Total: 35.59 km^{2} (13.74 sq mi)
- Elevation: 7 m (23 ft)

Population (2025-12-31)
  - Total: 1,369
  - Density: 38.47/km^{2} (99.63/sq mi)
- Time zone: UTC+01:00 (CET)
  - Summer (DST): UTC+02:00 (CEST)
- Postal codes: 49762
- Dialling codes: 05939
- Vehicle registration: EL

Sustrum is a municipality in the Emsland district, in Lower Saxony, Germany.
