= Annemarie Kremer =

Dutch opera singer

- Born: 2 June 1974 (age 52); Emmer-Compascuum, Netherlands
- Education: Maastricht Conservatory, The Dutch Opera Studio
- Occupation: operatic soprano
- Known for: Norma, Tosca, Salome

Annemarie Kremer (born 2 June 1974) is a Dutch operatic soprano, known for her performances in the title roles of Norma, Tosca, and Salome and as Vitellia in La clemenza di Tito. She has appeared at a variety of European opera houses including the Opernhaus Dortmund, the Staatsoper Stuttgart, and Opera North in England.

== Education ==
From the age of ten, Kremer studied piano and dance. She joined the Maastricht Conservatory at 18, and studied with vocal professor Mya Besselink. At 19 Kremer was admitted to The Dutch Opera Studio. She later received vocal coaching from the tenor Carlo Bergonzi and from the Dutch opera singer Cristina Deutekom.

== Critical assessment ==
In early 2012 George Hall of The Guardian said of her portrayal of Norma: "Her ample, wide-ranging voice keeps faith with Bellini's notes, maintaining dramatic intensity via seriousness of artistic purpose and commitment." Rupert Christiansen of The Daily Telegraph described Kremer's commitment as total, and said of the role: "Alden has drawn a strikingly vivid performance from the Dutch soprano Annemarie Kremer in the title-role" but added that "[her] voice isn't ideally beautiful or full-toned and her coloratura is imprecise." Robert Beal of Musical Opinion described her "not just a soprano of great technical resource, but one who can emote as well as sing and bring the two dimensions together to thrilling effect in this role" and "Her Casta diva, delivered in mesmerisingly beautiful mezza voce, seemed a genuine prayer: her voice dominated the great trio with soaring power."

== Notable roles ==
Kremer has sung the title roles in two of Puccini's operas, including Madama Butterfly in 2007 at the Green Mountain Opera Festival in Vermont, which was her US debut. She also sang the role at Opernhaus Dortmund in 2008. Tosca followed in 2008, also at the Opernhaus Dortmund.

In 2010 to 2011, her appearances in title roles have included Verdi's Luisa Miller at the Staatsoper Stuttgart, followed by Strauss' Salome the following year at the Vienna Volksoper

Opera North's production of Bellini's Norma in 2012 gave her an additional title role opportunity, while, in 2013, she was featured as Vitellia in Mozart's La clemenza di Tito, also with Opera North.
