= De Berk, Drenthe =

Windmill in Drenthe, Netherlands

De Berk
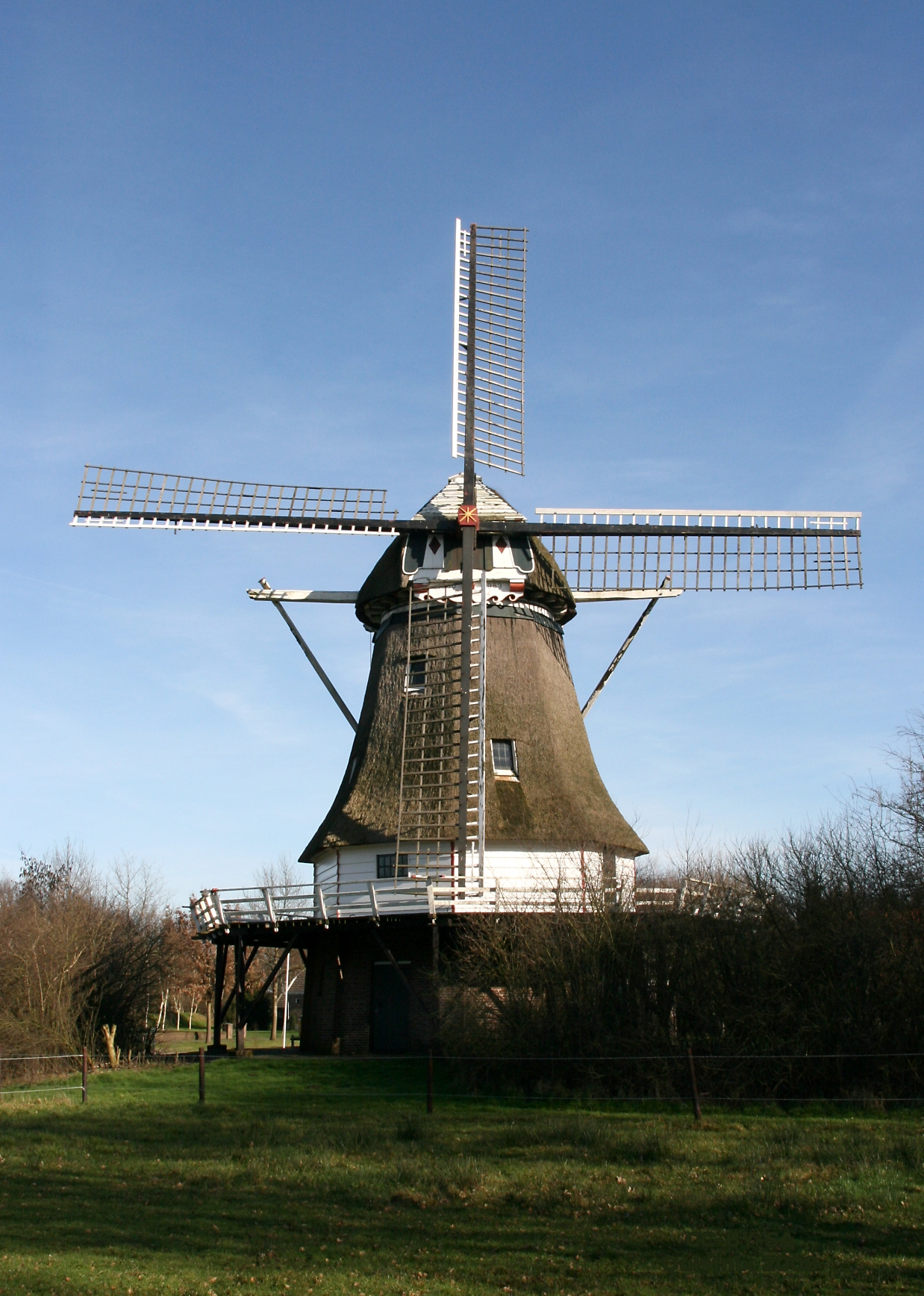
- Interactive map of De Berk

Origin
- Mill name: De Berk
- Mill location: Berkenrode 4, 7884 TR, Barger-Compascuum
- Coordinates: 52°45′17.37″N 7°01′49.14″E
- Operator: Stichting Veenpark
- Year built: 1983

Information
- Purpose: Corn Mill
- Type: Smock mill
- Storeys: Two-storey smock
- Base storeys: Two-storey base
- Smock sides: Eight sides
- No. of sails: Four sails
- Type of sails: Common sails
- Windshaft: Wood with cast iron poll end
- Winding: tailpole
- No. of pairs of millstones: One pair
- Size of millstones: 1.70 metres (5 ft 7 in)

De Berk (English: The Birch) is a smock mill in Barger-Compascuum, Netherlands. It was built in 1983.

== History ==
De Berk was originally built c. 1850 at Drantum, Lower Saxony, Germany. It was rebuilt after a fire in 1870. The mill was last worked commercially in 1952. In 1979, the mill was brought to the Netherlands by miller H E A Bokkers, of Overijssel. The mill was erected in the Veenpark, Barger-Compascuum in 1983. It was erected near the site of a mill which had been demolished in 1936. As of summer 2009, the mill is not in full working order, as repairs are required.

== Description ==
De Berk is what the Dutch describe as an "achtkant stellingmolen", an eight-sided smock mill with a stage. It is a two-storey smock mill on a two-storey brick base. The stage is at first-floor level, it is 3.20 metres (10 ft 6 in) above ground level. The smock and cap are thatched. The four Common sails have a span of 21.50 metres (70 ft 6 in). The wooden windshaft with a cast-iron poll end carries a brake wheel which has 62 cogs. This drives the wallower at the top of the upright shaft. The wallower has 34 cogs. The great spur wheel, at the lower end of the upright shaft has 100 cogs. This drives the lantern pinion stone nut with 37 staves. The millstones are driven overdrift. They are 1.70 metres (5 ft 7 in) diameter.
