= Fresenburg =

- Municipality
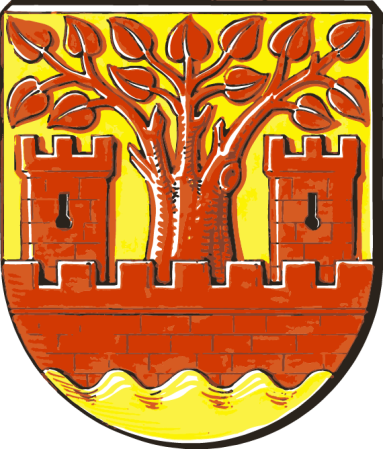
- Coat of arms

- Location of Fresenburg within Emsland district
- Interactive map of Fresenburg
- Location within Germany Location within Lower Saxony
- Coordinates: 52°53′N 07°18′E
- Country: Germany
- State: Lower Saxony
- District: Emsland
- Municipal assoc.: Lathen
- Subdivisions: 3 Ortsteile

Government
  - Mayor: Gerhard Führs (CDU)

Area
  - Total: 21.59 km^{2} (8.34 sq mi)
- Elevation: 9 m (30 ft)

Population (2025-12-31)
  - Total: 927
  - Density: 42.9/km^{2} (111/sq mi)
- Time zone: UTC+01:00 (CET)
  - Summer (DST): UTC+02:00 (CEST)
- Postal codes: 49762
- Dialling codes: 05933
- Vehicle registration: EL
- Website: www.fresenburg.de

Fresenburg is a municipality in the Emsland district, in Lower Saxony, Germany.
