= Lathen (Samtgemeinde) =

- Samtgemeinde
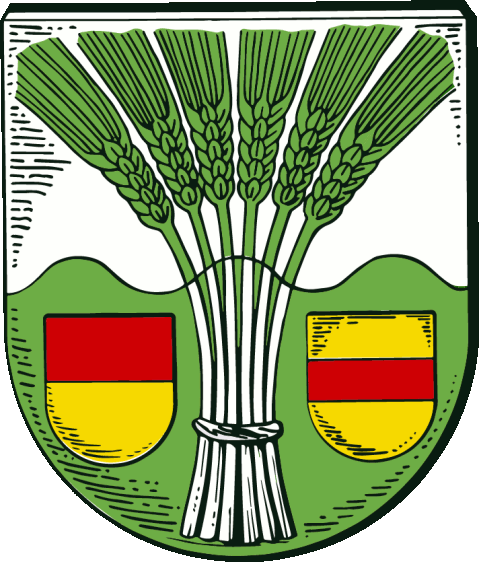
- Coat of arms

- Location of Lathen within Emsland district
- Interactive map of Lathen
- Location within Germany Location within Lower Saxony
- Coordinates: 52°52′N 7°19′E
- Country: Germany
- State: Lower Saxony
- District: Emsland

Government
  - Mayor (2019–24): Helmut Wilkens (CDU)

Area
  - Total: 165.65 km^{2} (63.96 sq mi)
- Elevation: 13 m (43 ft)

Population (2025-12-31)
  - Total: 12,048
  - Density: 72.732/km^{2} (188.37/sq mi)
- Time zone: UTC+01:00 (CET)
  - Summer (DST): UTC+02:00 (CEST)
- Vehicle registration: EL
- Website: sg-lathen.de

Samtgemeinde Lathen is a Samtgemeinde in the district Emsland in Lower Saxony, Germany.

The Samtgemeinde Lathen consists of the following municipalities:

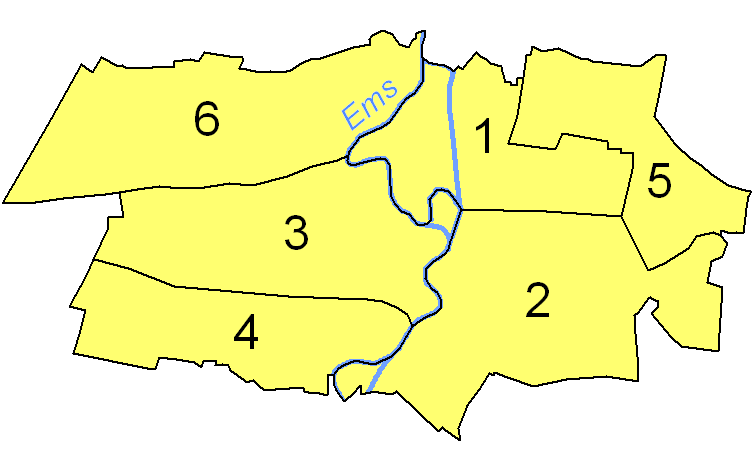

1. Fresenburg
2. Lathen
3. Niederlangen
4. Oberlangen
5. Renkenberge
6. Sustrum

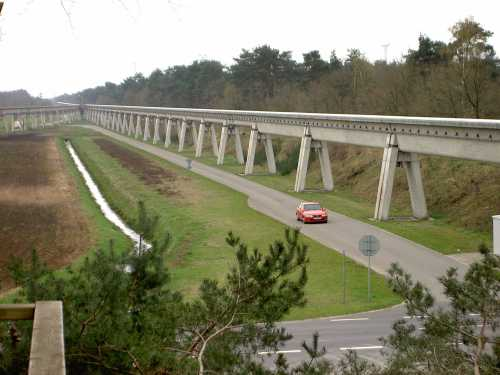
Part of the Transrapid test track in Lathen
