= Barger-Erfscheidenveen =

- Hamlet
- Location in province of Drenthe in the Netherlands Barger-Erfscheidenveen (Netherlands)
- Coordinates: 52.72739°N 6.86709°E
- Country: Netherlands
- Province: Drenthe
- Municipality: Emmen

Area
  - Total: 0.44 km^{2} (0.17 sq mi)
- Elevation: 15 m (49 ft)

Population (2021)
  - Total: 95
  - Density: 220/km^{2} (560/sq mi)
- Time zone: UTC+1 (CET)
  - Summer (DST): UTC+2 (CEST)
- Postal code: 7833
- Dialing code: 0591

Barger-Erfscheidenveen is a hamlet in the Netherlands and it is part of the Emmen municipality in Drenthe.

Barger-Erfscheidenveen is a statistical entity, however the postal authorities have placed it under Nieuw-Amsterdam. It was first mentioned in the 1850 as Het Erfscheiden Veen. The current name translates to "bog property boundaty of Barge". In 1904, a school was established. In 1932, it was home to 512 people. In 1985, the school closed. A part of the hamlet has been demolished during the construction of the A37 motorway.
