= Barger-Oosterveen =

- Hamlet
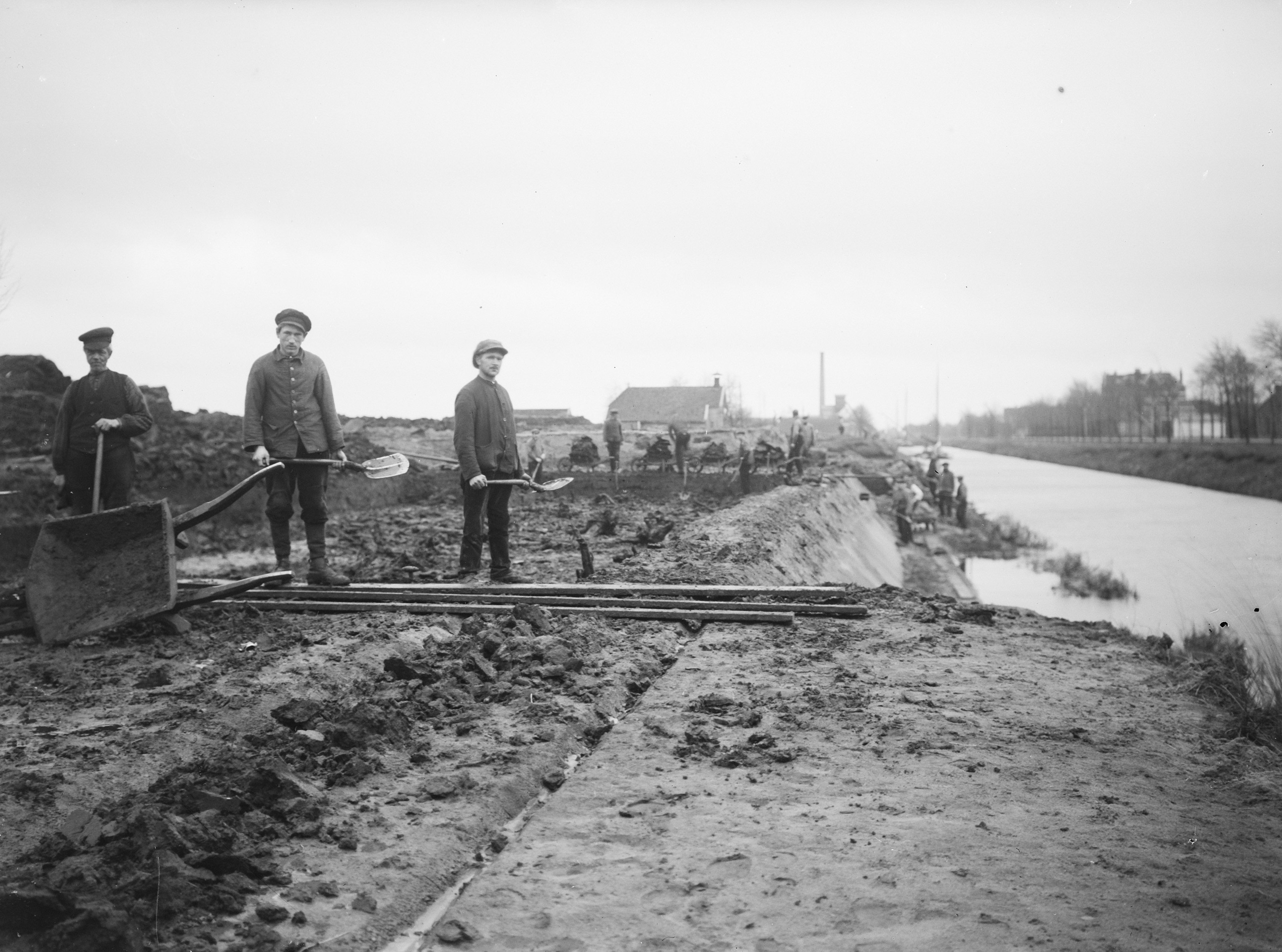
- Widening of the canal near Barger-Oostveen

- Location in province of Drenthe in the Netherlands Barger-Oosterveen (Netherlands)
- Coordinates: 52.7028°N 6.9747°E
- Country: Netherlands
- Province: Drenthe
- Municipality: Emmen

Area
  - Total: 0.43 km^{2} (0.17 sq mi)
- Elevation: 21 m (69 ft)

Population (2021)
  - Total: 310
  - Density: 720/km^{2} (1,900/sq mi)
- Time zone: UTC+1 (CET)
  - Summer (DST): UTC+2 (CEST)
- Postal code: 7891
- Dialing code: 0591

Barger-Oosterveen is a hamlet in the Netherlands and is part of the Emmen municipality in Drenthe.

Barger-Oosterveen is a statistical entity, however the postal authorities have placed it under Klazienaveen. It was first mentioned in 1867 as Ooster Veen, and means "The eastern bog near Barge".
