= Stalag VI-C =

Coordinates: 52.85875°N 7.184647°E

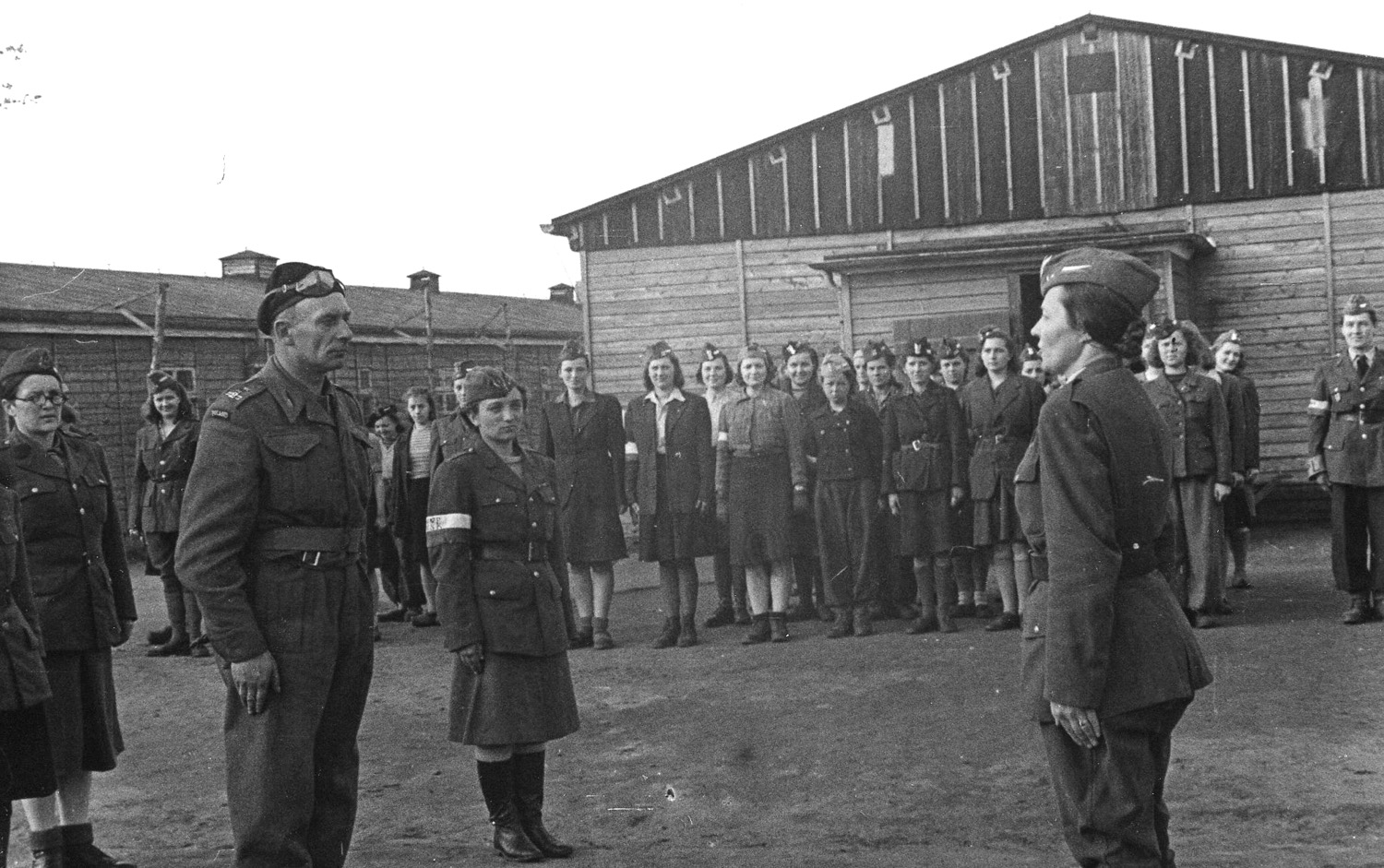
Last roll-call at Stalag VI-C Oberlangen following its liberation

Stalag VI-C was a World War II German POW camp located 6 km west of the village Oberlangen in Emsland in north-western Germany. It was originally built with five others in the same marshland area as a prison camp (Straflager) for Germans. From 1939 till 1945 the Oberlangen camp was a Prisoner of War camp.

Administratively, the camp was initially subordinate to Stalag VI-B Versen. However, with time it became the largest of a group of camps located at Alexisdorf, Dalum, Groß-Fullen, Groß-Hesepe, Neu-Versen, Wesuwe, Wietmarschen and Oberlangen, all collectively designated as Stalag VI-C/Z since 13 May 1942. The headquarters of the entire POW camp complex was located at Bathorn.

Following the fall of the Warsaw Uprising of 1944, the Stalag VI-C Oberlangen became the only POW camp in Nazi-occupied Europe for female prisoners of war.

An exhibition of this and the other 14 Emsland camps 1933-1945 was shown in the Documentation and Information Center (DIZ) Emslandlager in Papenburg between 1985 and 2011. From November 2011 to May 2024, the 'DIZ' was housed at the Esterwegen Gedenkstätte (memorial) and then moved back to Papenburg.

== History ==
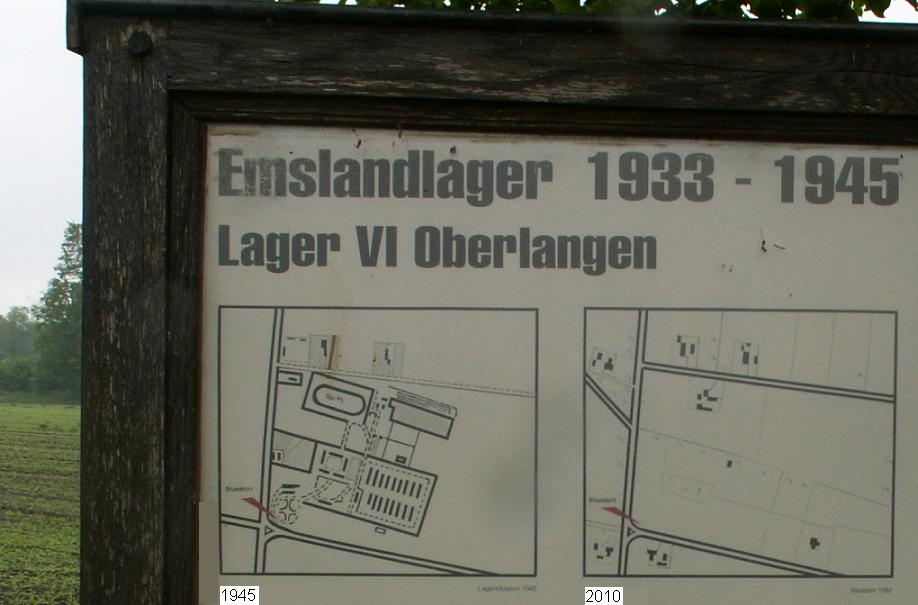
Plan of the sub-camp of Oberlangen

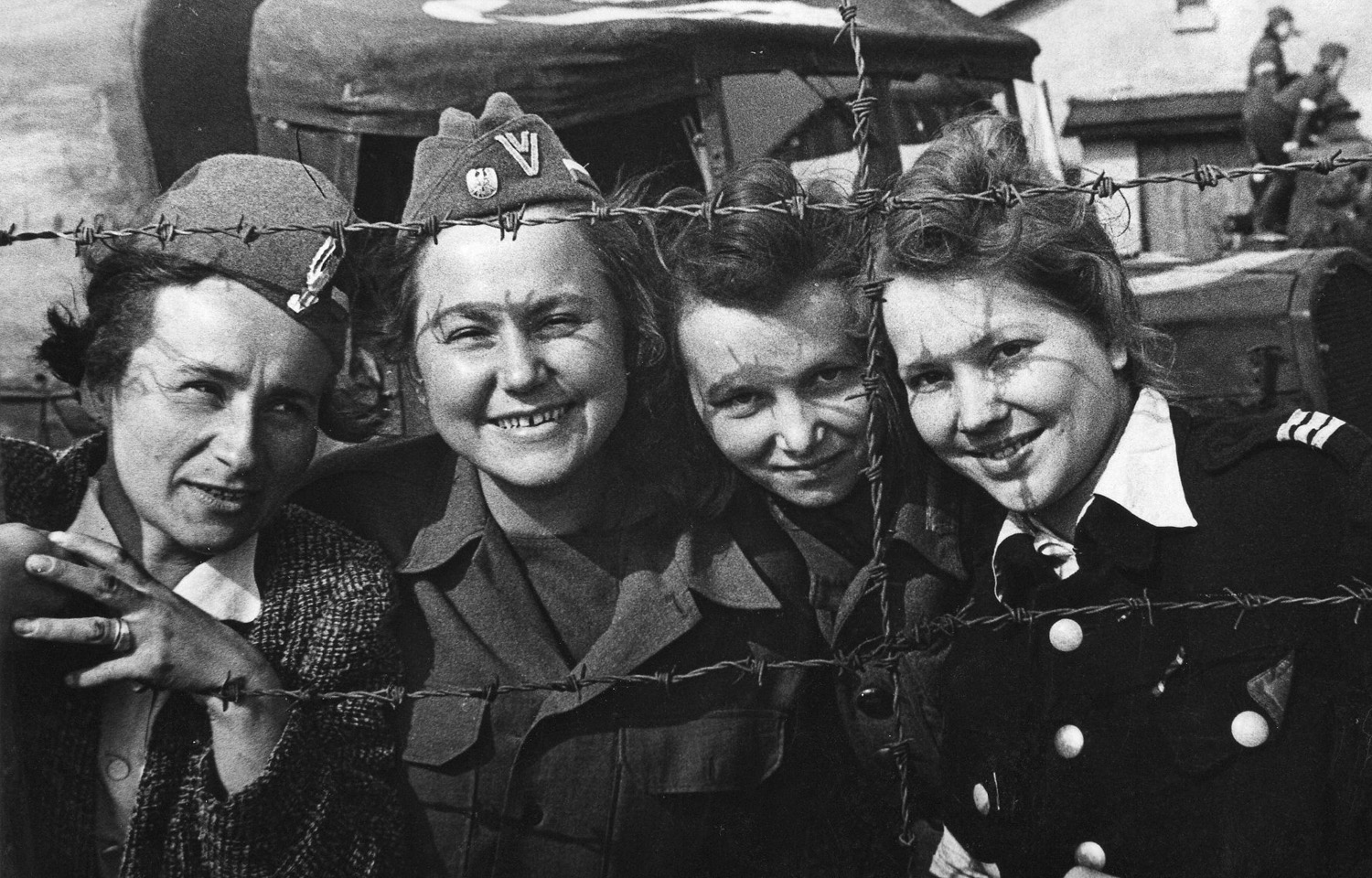
Polish female soldiers of the camp at Oberlangen shortly after liberation

The camp was built in September 1933 as a penal prison camp (German: Straflager) for Germans considered undesirable by the Nazi government. The sparsely populated wetlands of Emsland were ideal for the task as there were no large settlements nearby and the very existence of the camp could be held in secrecy. The original inmates included mostly political prisoners, such as German communists, but with time other categories of "undesirables" were also being incarcerated there. By May 1940 the remaining political prisoners were transferred to other German concentration camps elsewhere.

Already in September 1939 the camp was taken over by the military and turned into a Stalag - a prisoner of war camp, one of nine such POW camps in the area of Emsland. After the camp had been emptied and the political prisoners transferred elsewhere, in June 1940 a group of roughly 1,400 Polish officers taken captive during the 1939 invasion of Poland were transferred to the newly designated Stalag VI-C. However, in preparation for the Operation Barbarossa the Polish officers were transferred to other Oflags in April 1941 and later that summer the Stalag VI-C received roughly 2,000 Soviet prisoners of war. Conditions were appalling, starvation, epidemics and ill-treatment took a heavy toll of lives. The dead were buried in mass graves about 1 km north of the camp.

In September 1943 the subcamp Wesuwe was administratively combined with Oberlangen as Oflag VI-G and nearly 5,000 Italian officers were brought here after the Allied Armistice with Italy. A year later, in September 1944 the Italian officers were reclassified as internees, deprived of their rights under the Third Geneva Convention and shipped out to various labor camps throughout Germany.

Following the fall of the Warsaw Uprising parts of the prison camp complex were separated from the rest and in November 1944 started receiving Polish female soldiers and NCOs from Stalag XI-B Fallingbostel and other camps. Altogether the female camp housed 1,721 women, led by Lt. Maria Irena Mileska (codenamed "Jaga"). The International Red Cross had been advised that the camp was closed and was unaware of the Polish prisoners. The camp was finally liberated on 12 April 1945 by the Polish 1st Armoured Division. At that time there were 1,728 women in the camp.

== See also ==
- List of German World War II POW camps

== Sources ==
- Polish women of the Home Army
- The Memorial of Esterwegen - The Emsland Camps
- Stalag VI-B/Z Oberlangen in German
- Documentation and Information Center Emsland camps, Papenburg in German and English
