= George Percy Bargery =

English missionary and linguist

George Percy Bargery OBE (1 October 1876 – 2 August 1966) was an English missionary and linguist from Exeter, Devon.

Bargery was born in Exeter, where he was educated at Hele's School and Islington College. After attending the University of London, Bargery was ordained with the Church Missionary Society in 1899.

Bargery joined the Colonial Education Service and was sent to Northern Nigeria, serving until 1910. He published a Hausa-English Dictionary in 1934 that remains widely referenced and is available in several online versions. The dictionary was recognised as a tremendous achievement, and his alma mater, the University of London, rewarded him with a Doctorate in Literature in 1937. He also worked as a lecturer in the professor of Hausa at the university for several years while working in London on his dictionary.

He was married to Eliza Minnie "Nina" Turner from 1906 to her death in 1932. They had one son. He remarried in 1940 to Minnie Jane Martin, who died in 1952. In 1966, he died suddenly at his son's home in Tring, Hertfordshire, at age 90.

He was appointed an Officer of the Order of the British Empire (OBE) in the 1957 Birthday Honours. He returned to England from Nigeria permanently in 1957.

According to the School of Oriental and African Studies Library in London, where Bargery's collected papers are on deposit, his Hausa-English dictionary contained "the first tonal analysis of the Hausa language".

== Publications ==
- Bargery, George Percy (1934). A Hausa-English Dictionary and English-Hausa Vocabulary. London: Oxford University Press. ISBN 1-84453-114-7.
