= Niederlangen =

- Municipality
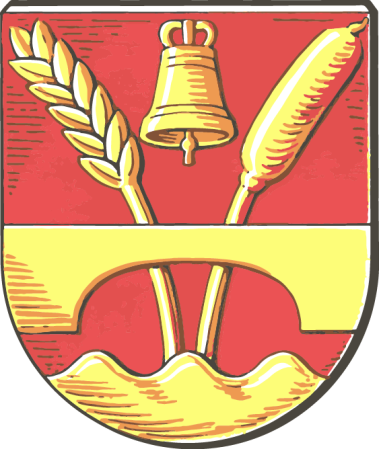
- Coat of arms

- Location of Niederlangen within Emsland district
- Interactive map of Niederlangen
- Location within Germany Location within Lower Saxony
- Coordinates: 52°51′N 07°17′E
- Country: Germany
- State: Lower Saxony
- District: Emsland
- Municipal assoc.: Lathen
- Subdivisions: 2

Government
  - Mayor: Heinrich Schwarte (CDU)

Area
  - Total: 29.37 km^{2} (11.34 sq mi)
- Elevation: 9 m (30 ft)

Population (2025-12-31)
  - Total: 1,319
  - Density: 44.91/km^{2} (116.3/sq mi)
- Time zone: UTC+01:00 (CET)
  - Summer (DST): UTC+02:00 (CEST)
- Postal codes: 49779
- Dialling codes: 05933
- Vehicle registration: EL
- Website: www.Niederlangen.de

Niederlangen is a municipality in the Emsland district, in Lower Saxony, Germany.
