= Zuidbarge =

- Neighbourhood / former village
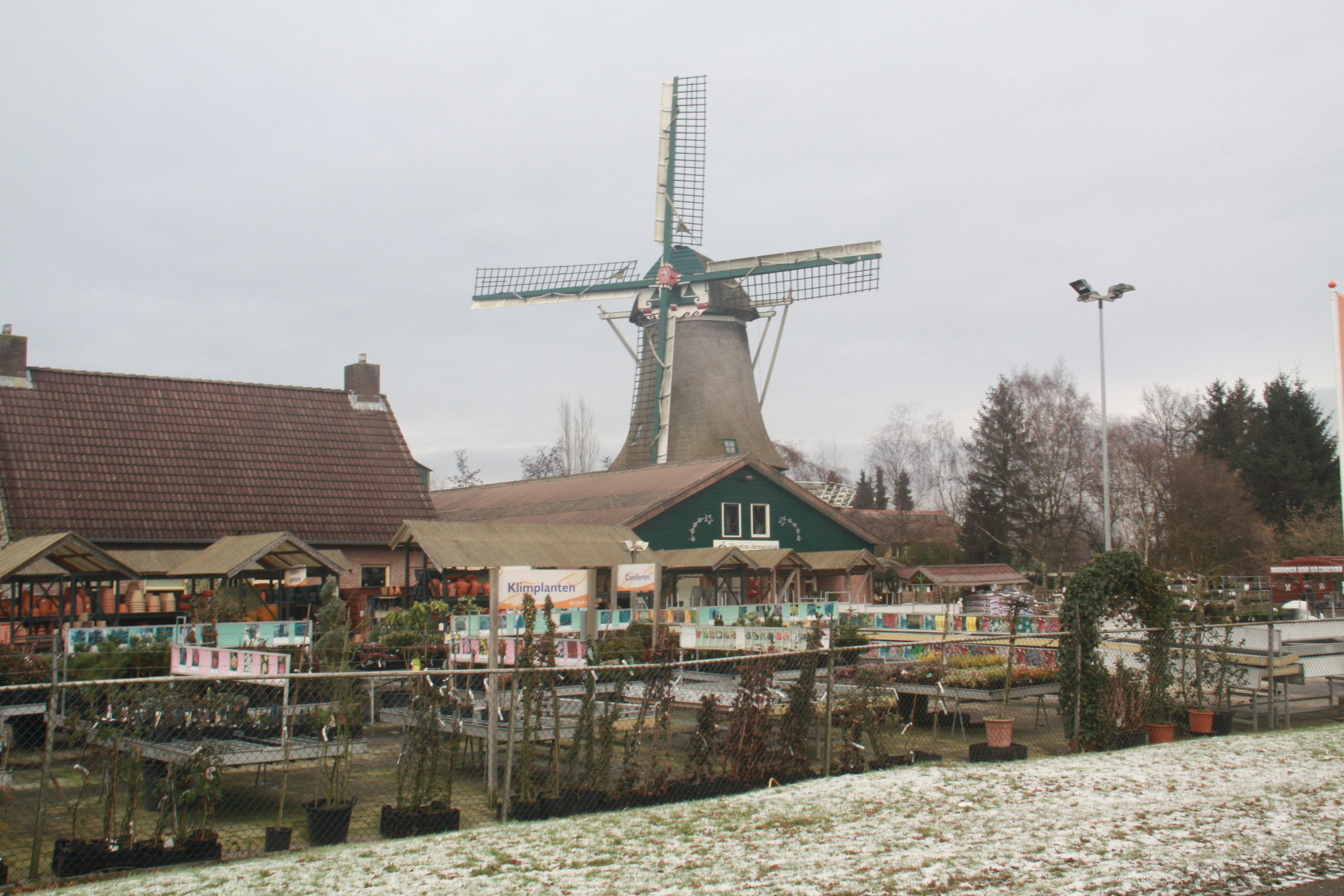

- Location in province of Drenthe in the Netherlands Zuidbarge (Netherlands)
- Coordinates: 52°45′N 6°54′E
- Country: Netherlands
- Province: Drenthe
- Municipality: Emmen

Area
  - Total: 0.95 km^{2} (0.37 sq mi)
- Elevation: 23 m (75 ft)

Population (2021)
  - Total: 405
  - Density: 430/km^{2} (1,100/sq mi)
- Postal code: 7812
- Dialing code: 0591

Zuidbarge is a neighbourhood of Emmen and former village in the Dutch province of Drenthe. The windmill Zeldenrust has been restored and is open to the public.

Zuidbarge was first mentioned in the 1416 as tot Zuytbarge. The name means the southern hill to distinguish itself from Noordbarge. In 1840, it was home to 205 people. In 1978, the village was annexed by neighbouring Emmen, and has become a neighbourhood.

== Gallery ==
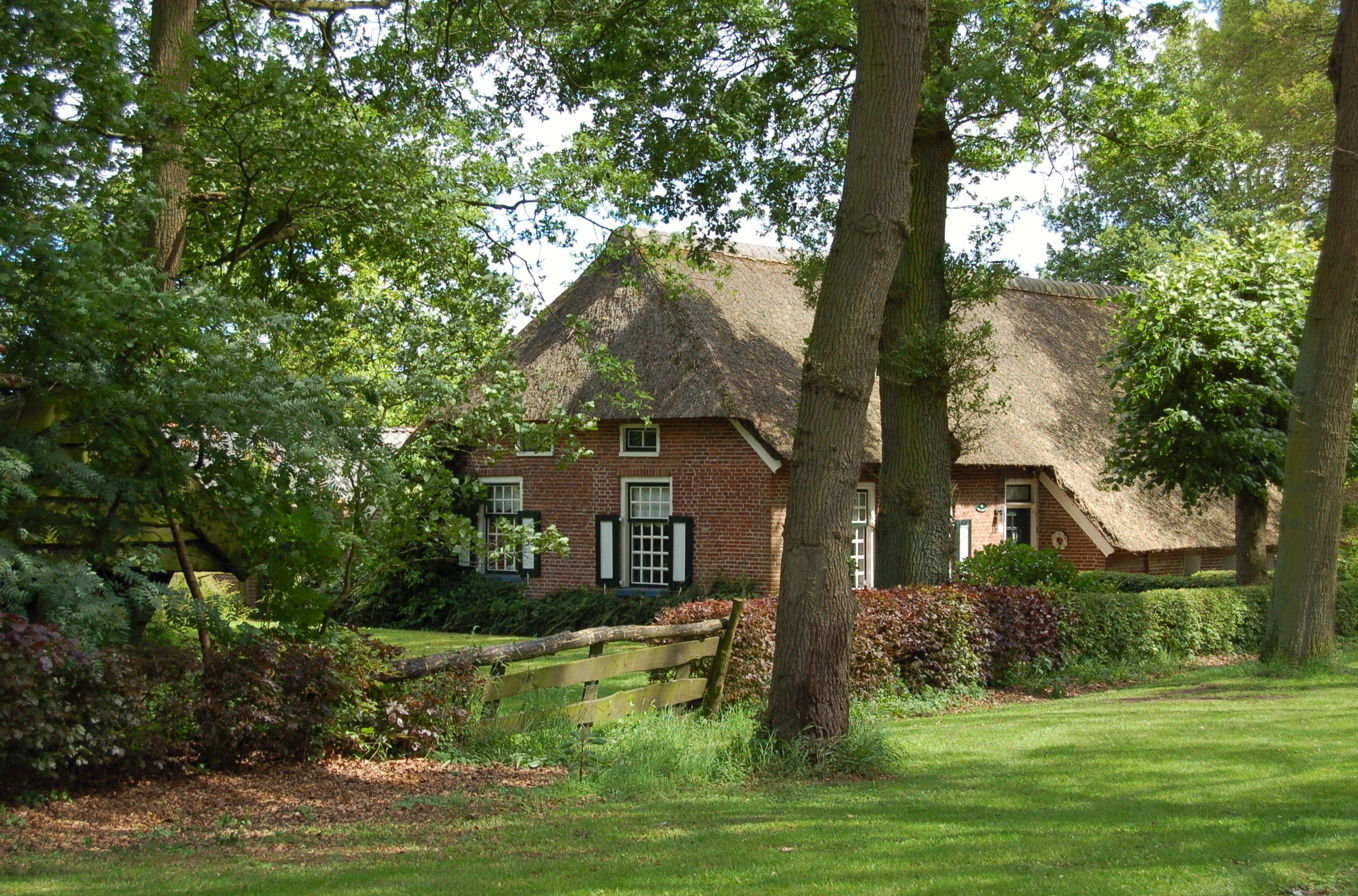
Farm in Zuidbarge

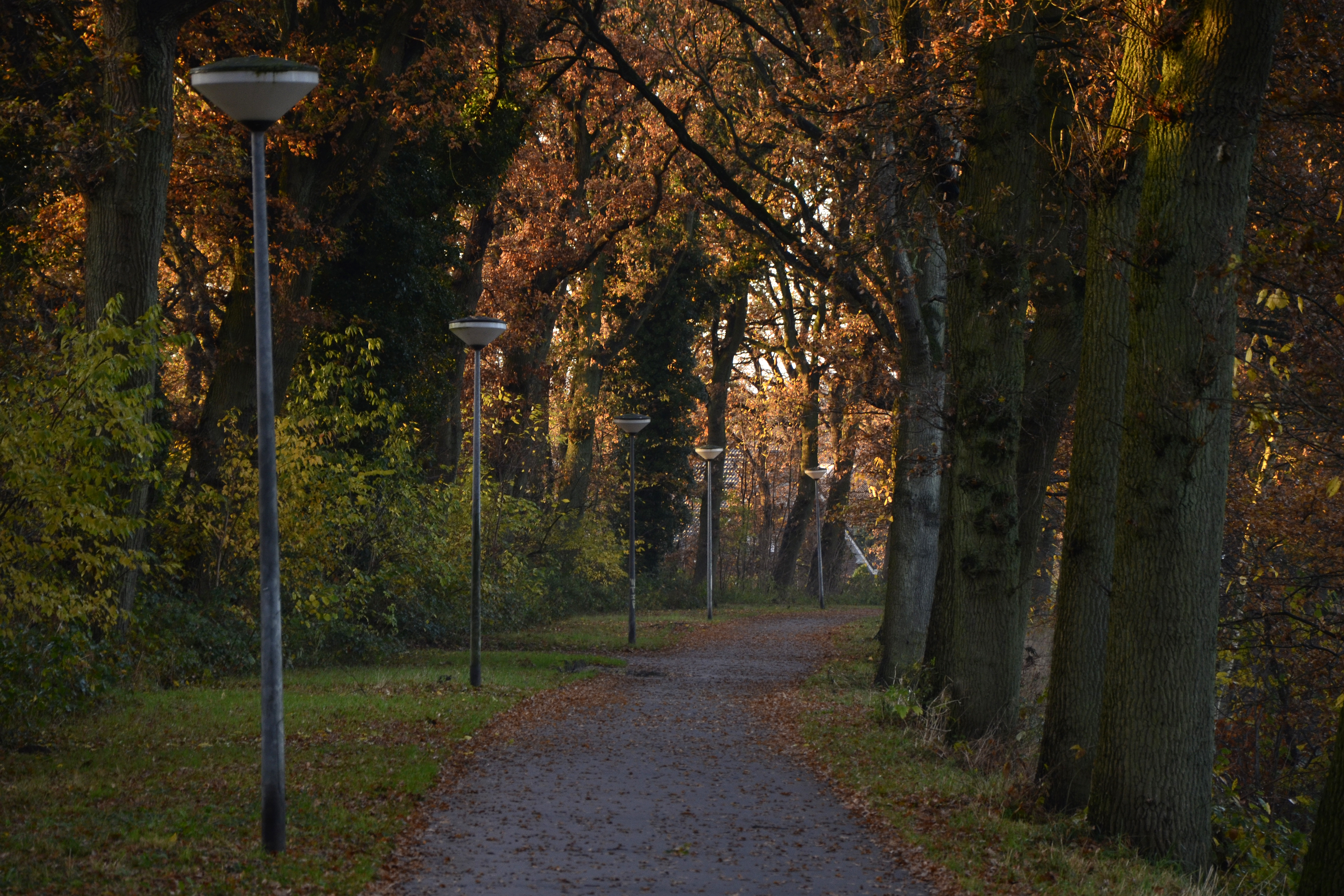
Path through the trees

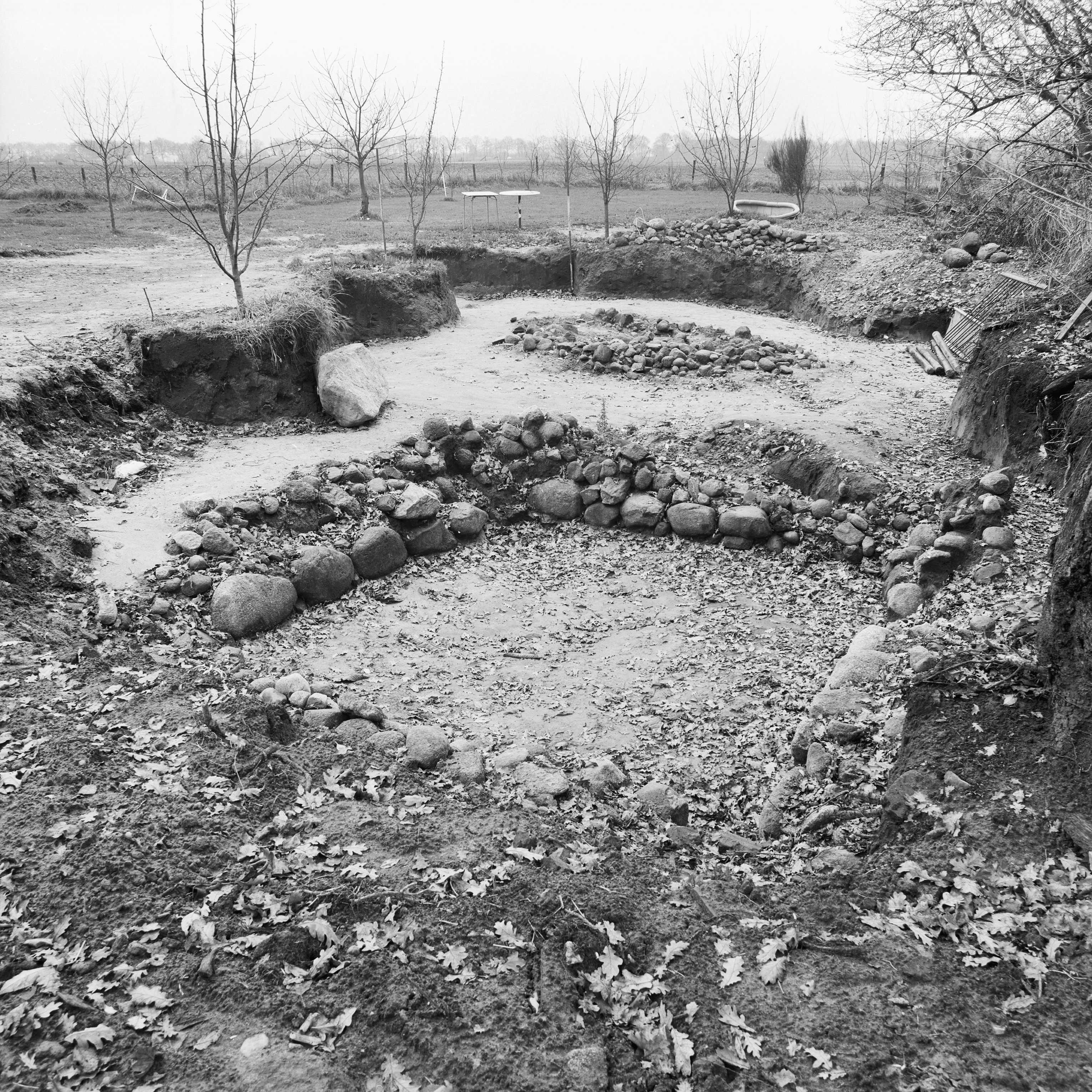
Water well

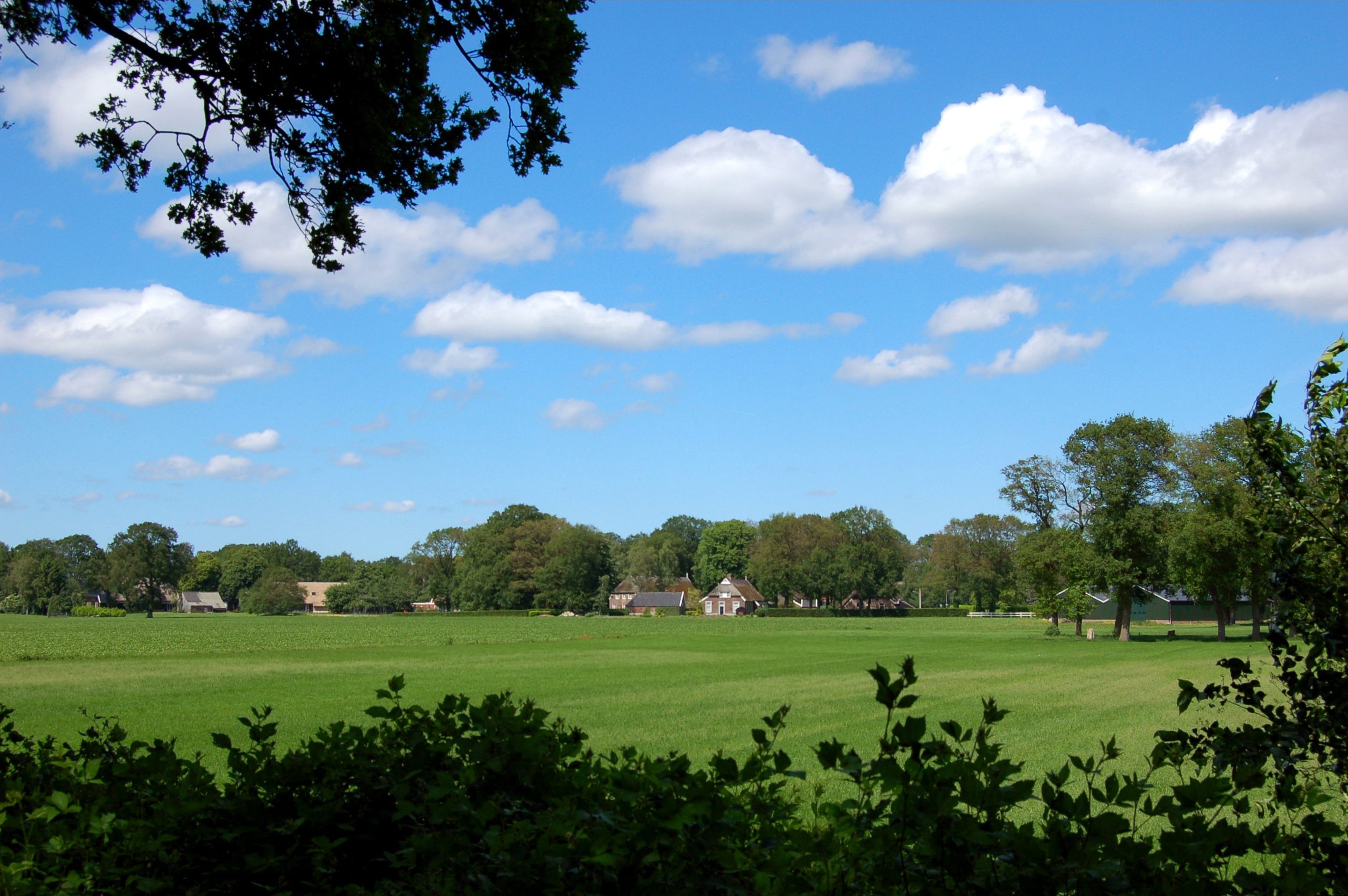
Zuidbarge
