= Noordbarge =

- Neighbourhood / former village
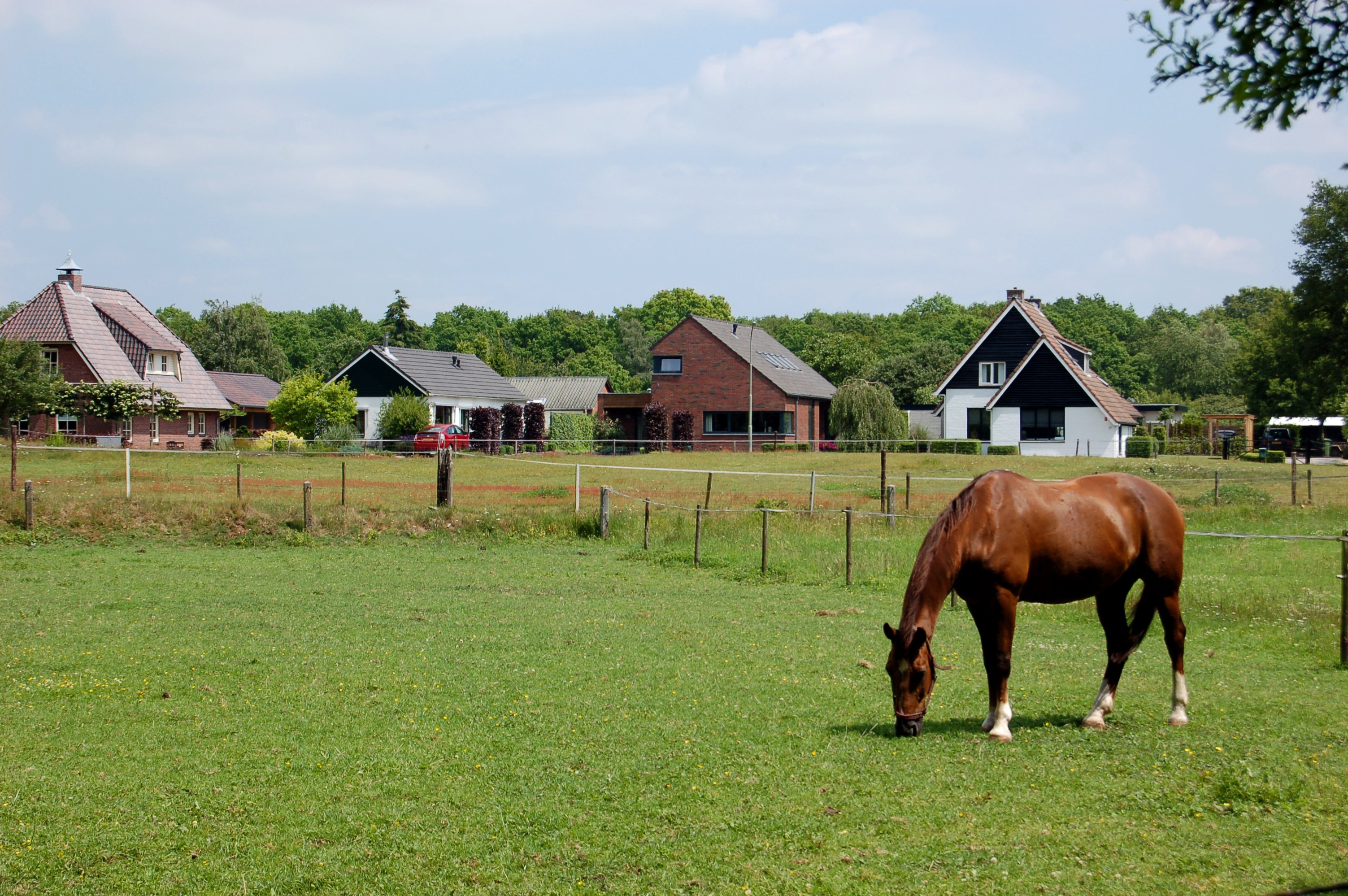

- Location in province of Drenthe in the Netherlands Noordbarge (Netherlands)
- Coordinates: 52.7726°N 6.8852°E
- Country: Netherlands
- Province: Drenthe
- Municipality: Emmen

Area
  - Total: 1.16 km^{2} (0.45 sq mi)
- Elevation: 23 m (75 ft)

Population (2021)
  - Total: 1,100
  - Density: 950/km^{2} (2,500/sq mi)
- Postal code: 7812
- Dialing code: 0591

Noordbarge is a neighbourhood and former village in Emmen in the province of Drenthe in the Netherlands

== History ==
Noordbarge was first mentioned in the 1380s as Berghe. The name means the north hill to distinguish itself from Zuidbarge. In 1840, it was home to 347 people. In 1978, the village was annexed by neighbouring Emmen, and has become a neighbourhood.

== Gallery ==
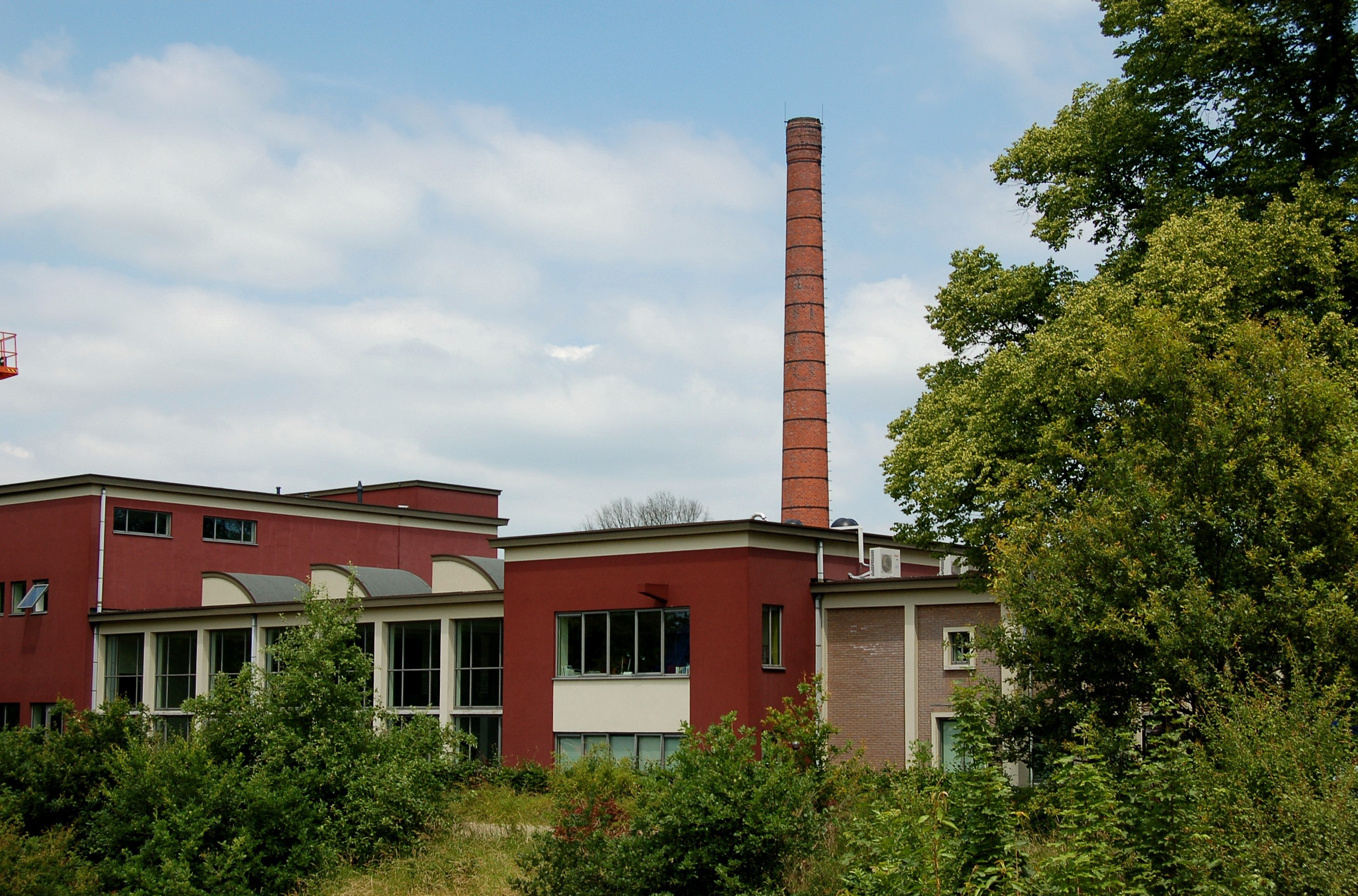
Former dairy factory

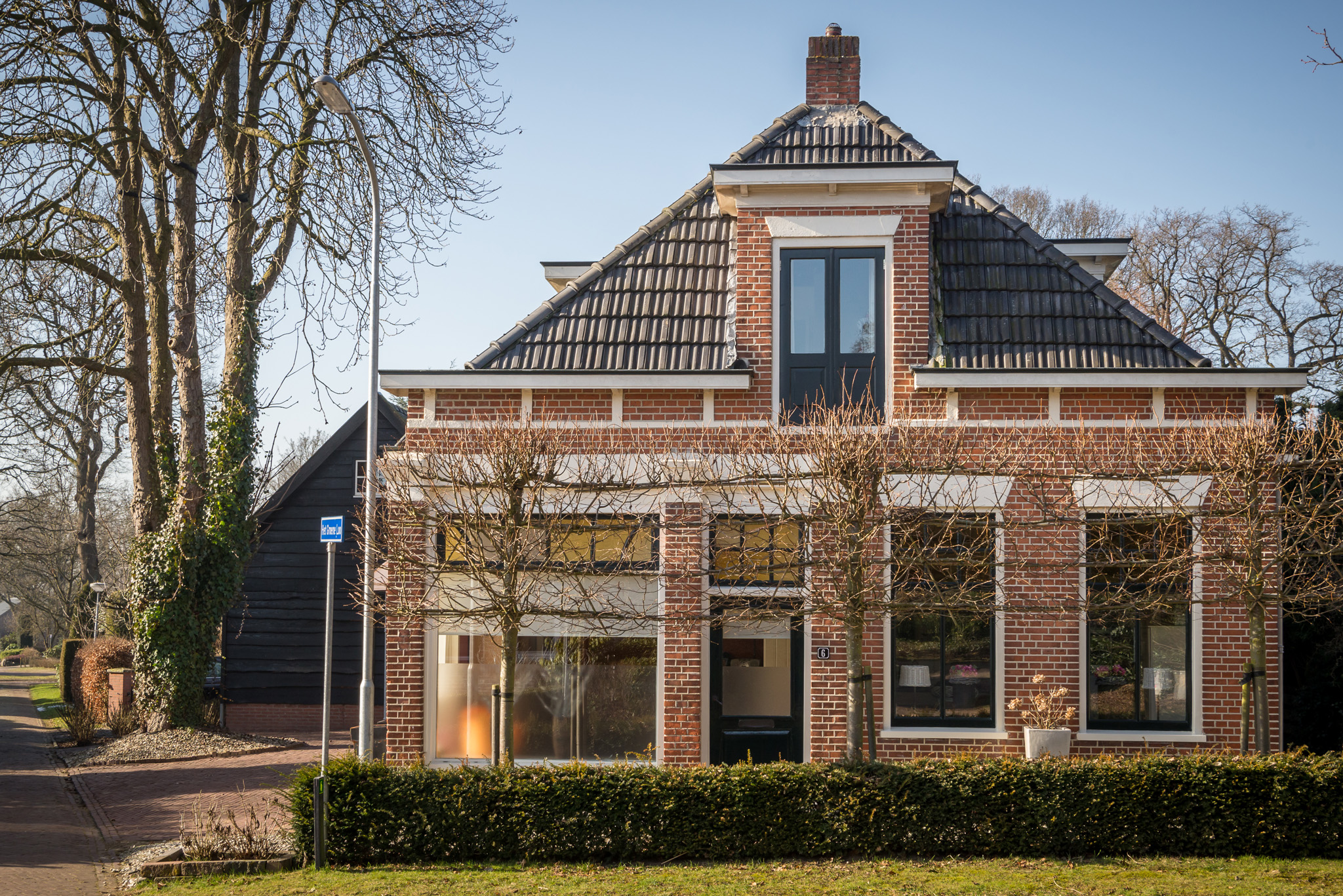
Farm in Noordbarge
