= Oberlangen =

- Municipality
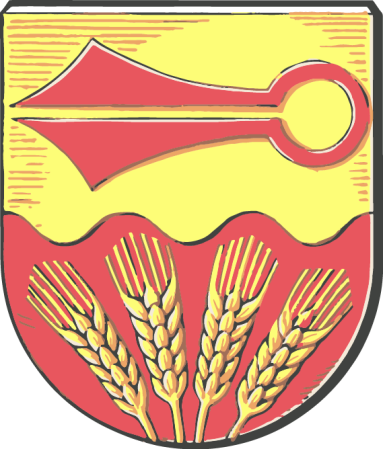
- Coat of arms

- Location of Oberlangen within Emsland district
- Interactive map of Oberlangen
- Location within Germany Location within Lower Saxony
- Coordinates: 52°51′N 07°17′E
- Country: Germany
- State: Lower Saxony
- District: Emsland
- Municipal assoc.: Lathen

Government
  - Mayor: Georg Raming-Freesen (CDU)

Area
  - Total: 22.12 km^{2} (8.54 sq mi)
- Elevation: 9 m (30 ft)

Population (2025-12-31)
  - Total: 994
  - Density: 44.9/km^{2} (116/sq mi)
- Time zone: UTC+01:00 (CET)
  - Summer (DST): UTC+02:00 (CEST)
- Postal codes: 49779
- Dialling codes: 05933
- Vehicle registration: EL
- Website: www.oberlangen.de

Oberlangen is a municipality in district (Landkreis) Emsland, Lower Saxony (Niedersachsen), north-western Germany.

This was the location of the Prisoner-of-war camp Stalag VI-C. There is a cemetery with mass graves of Soviet prisoners, and individual graves of Polish and Italian prisoners.

== See also ==
- Stalag VI-C
