= Frisian Way =

Medieval trade route in northwest Germany

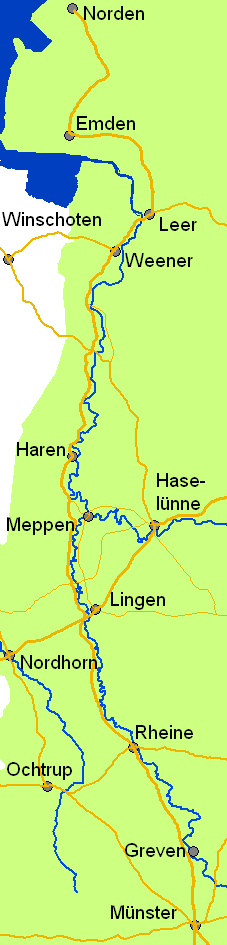
Friesische Straße

The Frisian Way (German: Friesische Straße) was a medieval trade route and imperial road in the northwest of Germany. It had a length of about 220 km and linked the town of Norden in East Frisia with Münster in Westphalia.

== Course ==
The Frisian Way ran from Norden to Emden roughly along the line of the present day federal roads, the B 72 and B 210. From Emden it ran approximately along the route of the B 31 to Leer. In Leer it crossed the Ems and then ran southwards roughly parallel to the Ems on its left bank to Münster. It followed the approximate course of the B 436 (Leer - Weener), the L 31 (Weener - Rhede), K 155 (Rhede - Heede) and 156 (Heede), L 48 (Heede - Altenlingen), K 34 (Nordlohne - Schepsdorf), L 40 (Elbergen - Emsbüren), K 327 (Emsbüren - Salzbergen), L 39 (Salzbergen - Lower Saxony/North Rhine-Westphalia state border) and 501 (state border - Rheine), the federal roads of the B 481 (Rheine - Emsdetten) and B 219 (Sprakel - Münster).

== Junctions with other roads ==
From Leer there was an eastern road to Oldenburg that continued to Bremen. In Weener a road branched off west to Winschoten and from there to Groningen. From Rhede there was a junction with an easterly road to Aschendorf which continued via the geest ridges of the Hümmling to Haselünne to the Flemish Way (Lübeck - Brügge). South of Heede another road from Winschoten to the trade route of the Hümmling crossed the Frisian Way. West of Meppen another road branches off to Haselünne. Southwest of Lingen the Flemish Way crosses the Frisian Way. In Rheine there were other roads running to Osnabrück and Enschede. In Münster there were links to Cologne (the Cologne Way), Coesfeld (the Coesfeld Way), Gronau (Horstmar Land Way) and via Warendorf to Paderborn (Hesse Way).

== Towns along the Frisian Way ==
Norden - Emden - Leer - Weener - Haren - Meppen - Lingen - Rheine - Emsdetten - Greven - Münster

== See also ==
Altstraße
