= Lahn (disambiguation) =

Lahn may refer to:

- the Lahn, a river in western Germany
- Lahn, Hesse, a city that existed between 1977 and 1979 as a merger of Wetzlar and Gießen, in Hesse, Germany
- Lahn, Lower Saxony, a municipality in the district of Emsland, Lower Saxony
- Lahn (Wald im Pinzgau), a village in the municipality Wald im Pinzgau, Austria
- Lähn, German name of the town Wleń in Poland
- How to Make Millions Before Grandma Dies, known in Thai as Lahn Mah
