= Harmen Harmense Gansevoort =

Harmen Harmense Gansevoort (c. 1634 – July 23, 1709) was an early American settler, brewer, landowner, and patriarch of the Gansevoort family.

== Early life ==
Harmen Harmense Gansevoort was born ca. 1634 in Dersum, Prince-Bishopric of Münster, Holy Roman Empire. He was son of peasant farmer and beer brewer Hermann Nanckemann and his wife Elisabeth Gansevorth. After his father has died in 1652, Harmen moved to the region's main city, Groningen, Dutch Republic, to learn beer brewing.

== New Netherland ==
In 1655, Herman emigrated to New Netherland, first he lived in New Amsterdam, later in Catskill and, since 1657, in Beverwijck. Beverwijck was renamed Albany after the English took control of the colony in 1664. Harmen was a prominent beer brewer and landowner in Albany. He also earned money as a businessman and fur trader.

== Personal life ==
Harmen married ca. 1667 in Albany Maritje Leendertse Conyn (ca. 1646/50–1743), she was daughter of beer brewer Leendert Phillipse Conyn (1620–1704) and his wife Agnietje Casparse Stynmets, of Albany. Their marriage may have produced as many as twelve children. By the time of 1697, he had become a member of the Dutch Reformed Church of Albany, previously he had been a Lutheran.

Harmen died on July 23, 1709 (other sources say January 23, 1708) in Albany, he was ca. 75 years of age. Harmen was buried in the Lutheran cemetery, but in the 1860s his grave was moved to the Albany Rural Cemetery. His wife Maritje died in 1743.
