= Ems (river) =

River in Germany and the Netherlands

Ems Eems (Dutch, Low German), Iems (Westfalian), Oamse (Saterland Frisian), Amisia (Latin)
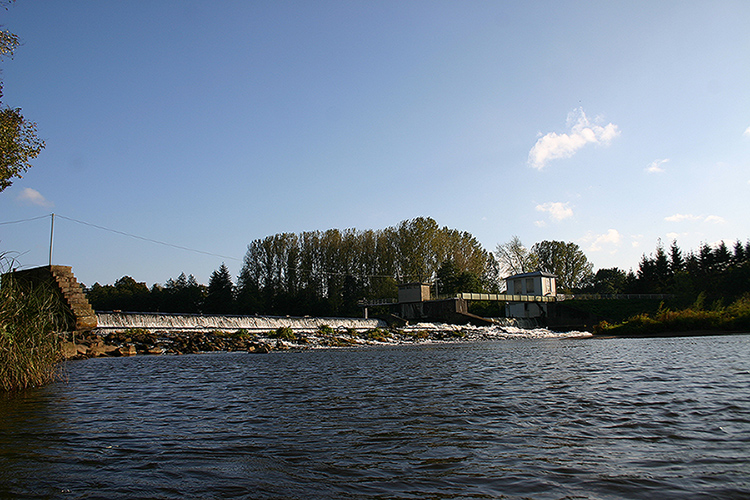
- The Ems near Lingen

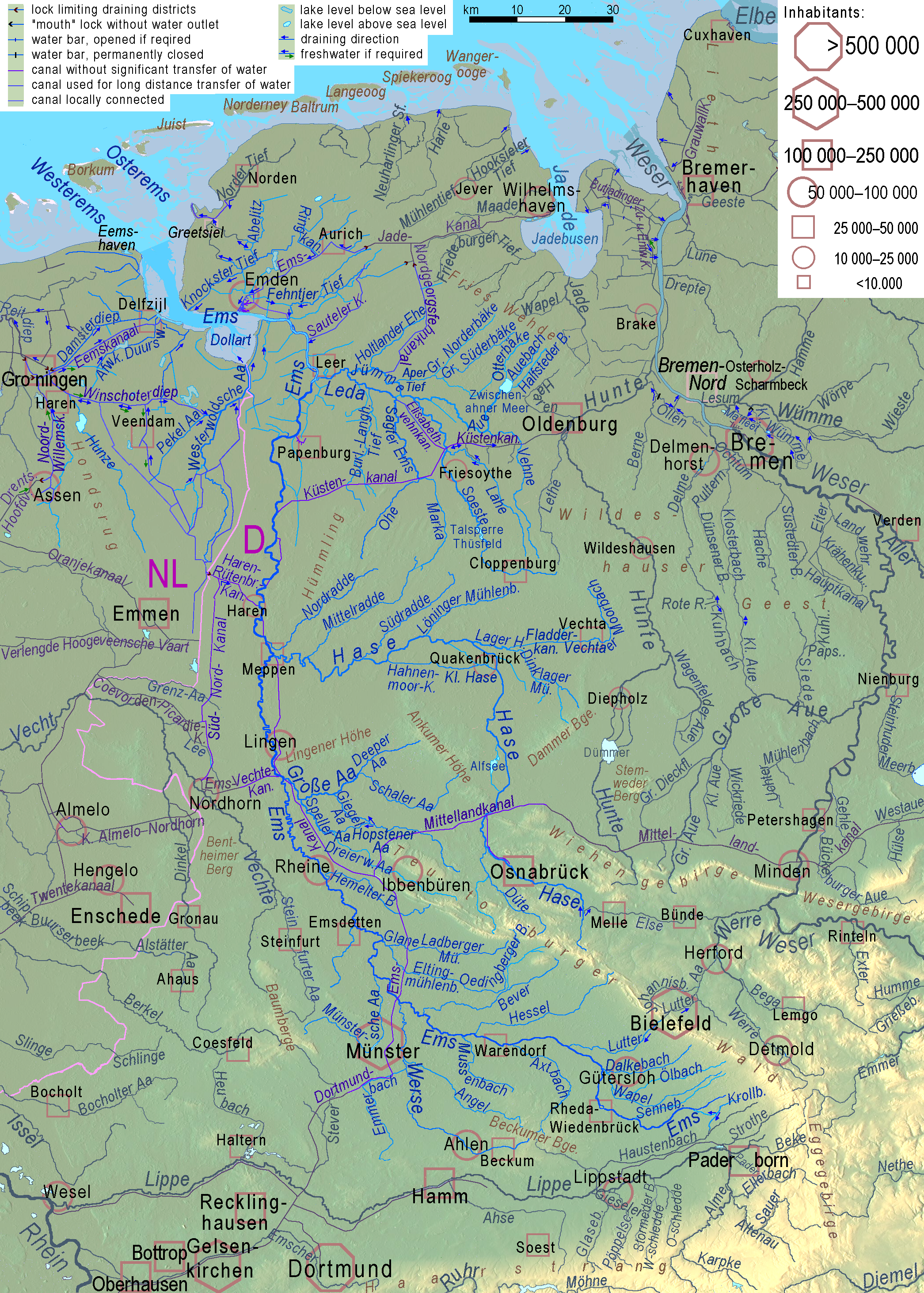
- River system of the Ems

Location
- Country: Germany and Netherlands(part of watershed)
- States: Lower Saxony and North Rhine-Westphalia
- Region: Emsland
- Cities: Rheda-Wiedenbrück; Gütersloh; Warendorf; Rheine; Lingen; Meppen; Papenburg; Leer; Emden

Physical characteristics
- Source
  - location: Schloß Holte-Stukenbrock
  - coordinates: 51°51′21″N 8°41′55″E
  - elevation: 134 m (440 ft)
- Mouth: Dollart Bay/North Sea
  - location: Emden
  - coordinates: 53°19′32″N 7°14′41″E
  - elevation: 0 m (0 ft)
- Length: 362.4 km (225.2 mi)
- Basin size: 17,934 km^{2} (6,924 sq mi)
- Discharge
  - location: Emden
  - average: 80 m^{3}/s (2,800 cu ft/s)

Basin features
- Tributaries
  - right: Leda, Hase

The Ems (German: Ems [ɛms]; Dutch: Eems [eːms]) is a river in northwestern Germany. It runs through the states of North Rhine-Westphalia and Lower Saxony, and discharges into the Dollart Bay which is part of the Wadden Sea. Its total length is 362.4 kilometres (225.2 mi). The state border between the Lower Saxon area of East Friesland (Germany) and the province of Groningen (Netherlands), whose exact course was the subject of a border dispute between Germany and the Netherlands (settled in 2014), runs through the Ems estuary.

== Course ==
The source of the river is in the southern Teutoburg Forest in North Rhine-Westphalia. In Lower Saxony, the brook becomes a comparatively large river. Here the swampy region of Emsland is named after the river. In Meppen the Ems is joined by its largest tributary, the Hase River. It then flows northwards, close to the Dutch border, into East Frisia. Near Emden, it flows into the Dollard bay (a national park) and then continues as a tidal river towards the Dutch city of Delfzijl.

Between Emden and Delfzijl, the Ems forms the border between the Netherlands and Germany and was subject to a mild dispute: the Dutch believed that the border runs through the geographical centre of the estuary, whereas the Germans claimed it runs through the deepest channel (which is close to the Dutch coast).

This became an active issue in late July 1914, when the Imperial German government began plans to mine the whole of the estuary that they claimed, in preparation for the launching of the Great War. The Dutch envoy in Berlin, Wilem Alexander Frederik Baron Gevers, tactfully announced the boundary was uncertain, and that the dispute was "opgeschort", which could mean either "suspended" or "resolved", depending on the context. The Dutch government endorsed the ambiguous declaration, thus relieving itself of an obligation to declare war on Germany for violating its neutrality. After the war, the dispute was resumed.

As the parties have now become friendly states with an open border, the argument later went no further than an agreement to disagree; the issue was settled amicably in October 2014.

Past Delfzijl, the Ems discharges into the Wadden Sea, part of the North Sea. The two straits that separate the German island of Borkum from its neighbours Rottumeroog (Netherlands) and Memmert (Germany) continue the name "Ems", as they are called Westere(e)ms and Osterems (West and East Ems).

== Tourism ==
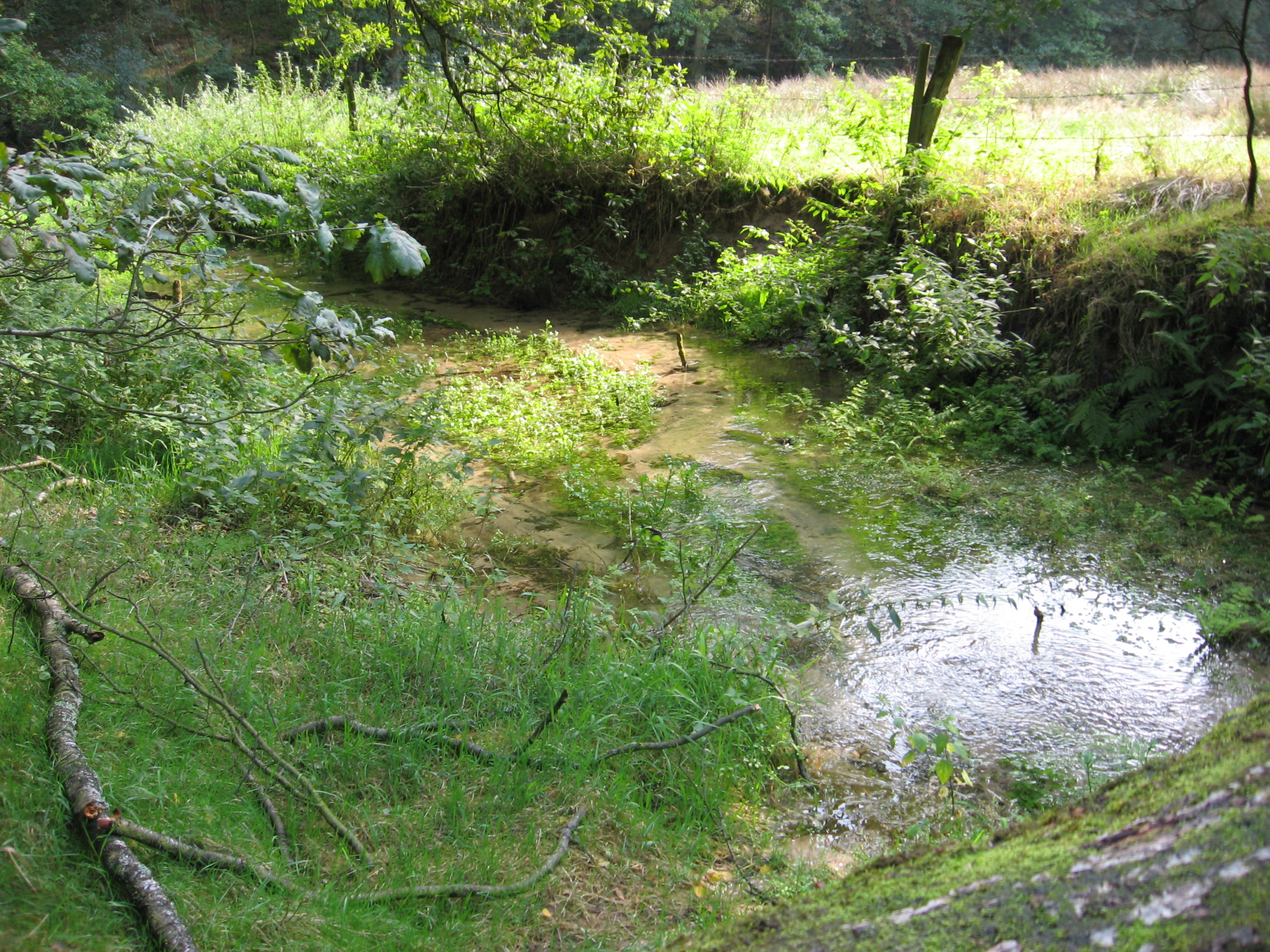
The Ems only a few hundred yards from its spring in Schloß Holte-Stukenbrock

The Ems is accompanied and crossed by different long-distance bicycle routes:

- EmsAuenWeg
- Emsland Route
- Hase Ems Weg

== Cities and municipalities ==
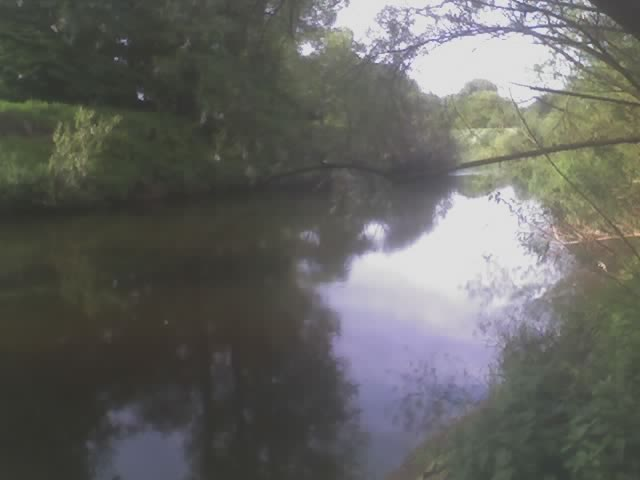
Ems near Telgte

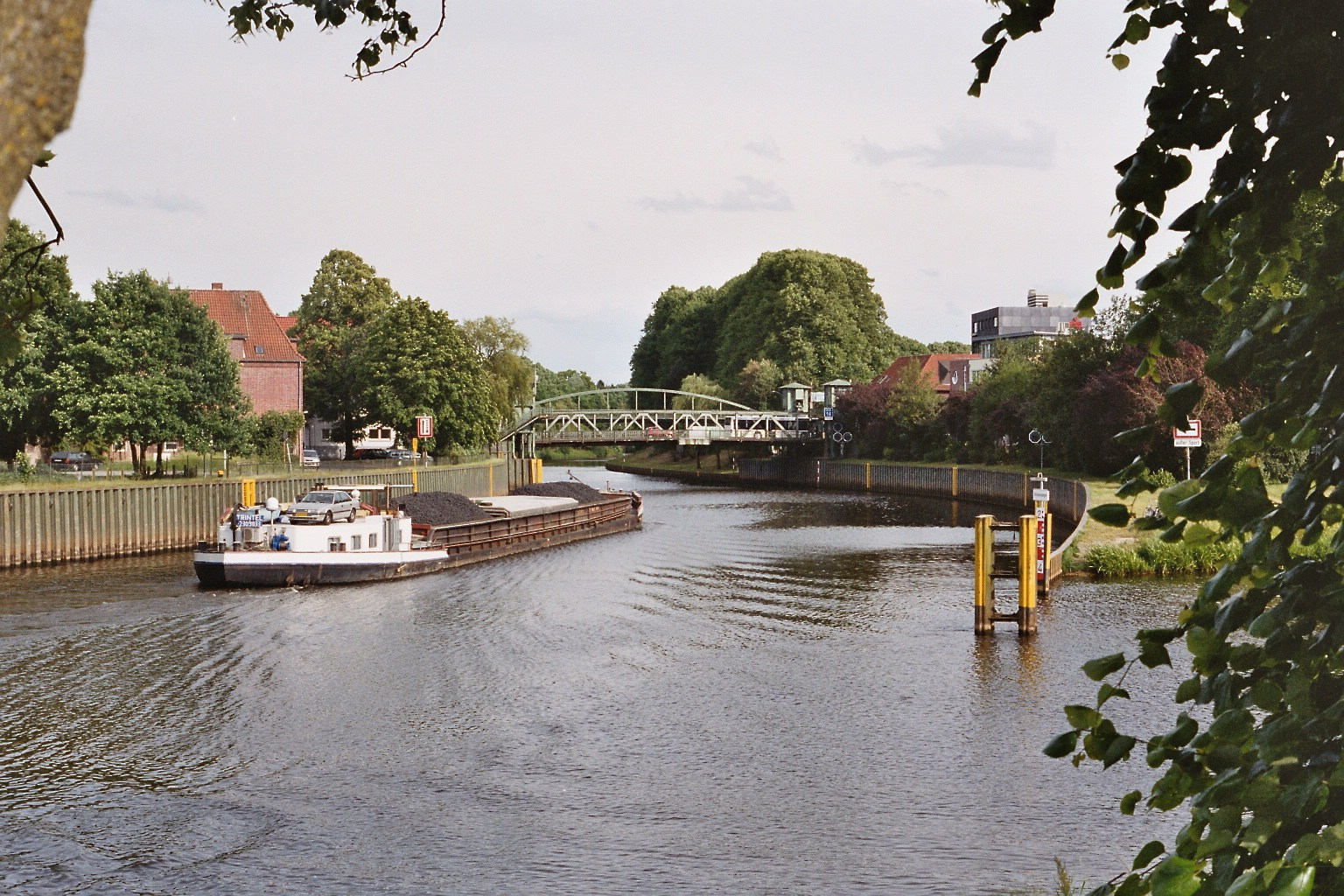
Ems in Meppen

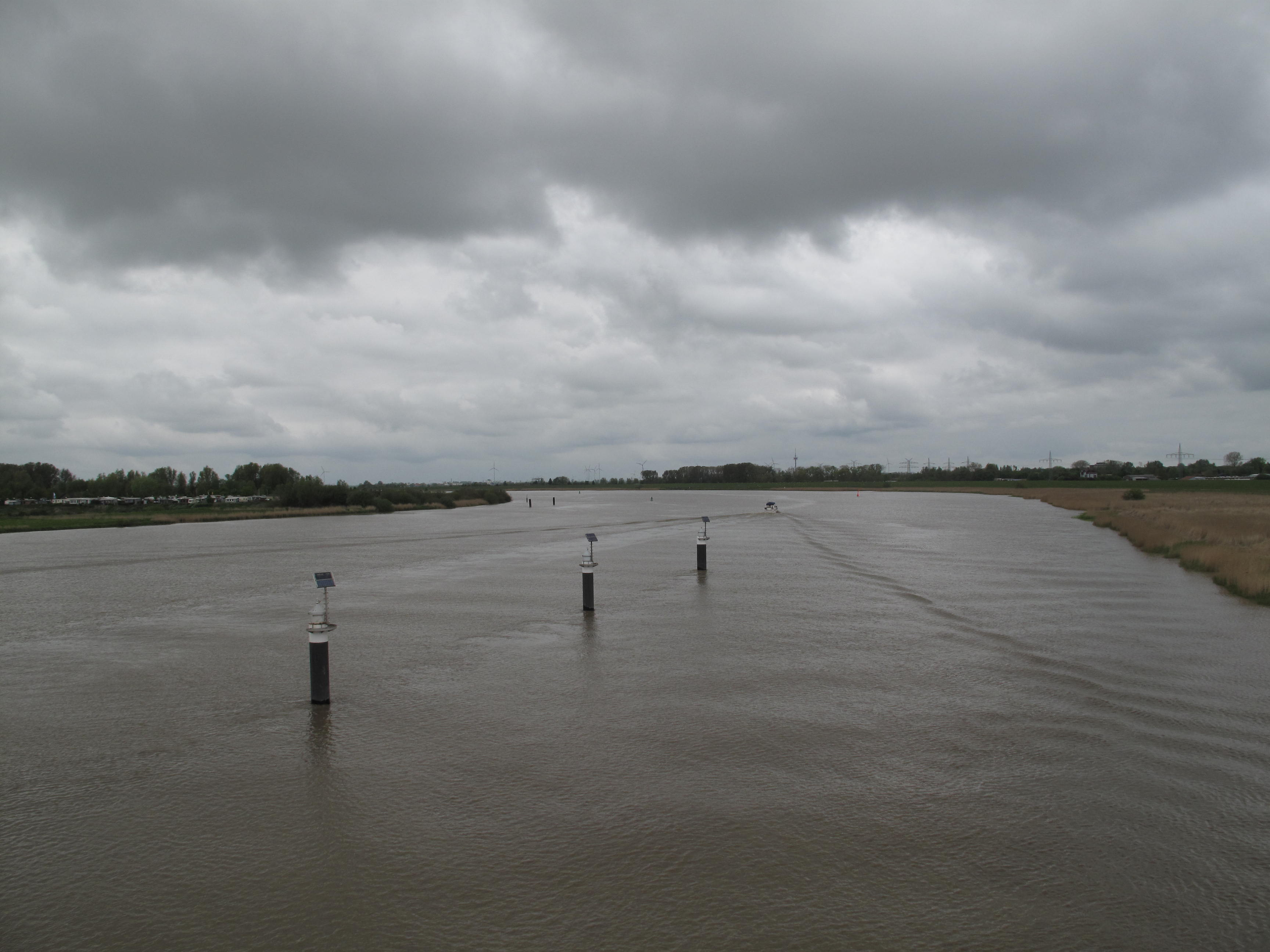
Ems near Leer

- Schloß Holte-Stukenbrock
- Hövelhof
- Steinhorst
- Westerwiehe
- Schöning
- Rietberg
- Rheda-Wiedenbrück
- Harsewinkel
- Warendorf
- Telgte
- Greven
- Emsdetten
- Rheine
- Salzbergen
- Emsbüren
- Lingen
- Geeste
- Meppen
- Haren
- Lathen
- Kluse
- Dörpen
- Lehe
- Aschendorf
- Tunxdorf
- Papenburg
- Weener
- Leer
- Jemgum
- Midlum
- Critzum
- Rorichum
- Gandersum
- Emden
- Knock
- Delfzijl

== Tributaries ==
- Wapelbach
- Dalke
- Lutter
- Axtbach
- Hessel
- Bever
- Werse
- Eltingmühlenbach
- Große Aa
- Hase
- Nordradde
- Leda

== History ==
The Ems was known to several ancient authors: Pliny the Elder in Natural History (4.14), Tacitus in the Annals (Book 1), Pomponius Mela (3.3), Strabo and Ptolemy, Geography (2.10). Ptolemy's name for it was the Amisios potamos, and in Latin Amisius fluvius. The others used the same, or Amisia, or Amasia or Amasios. The identification is certain, as it always is listed between the Rhine and the Weser, and was the only river leading to the Teutoburg Forest.

The Amisius flowed from the Teutoburg Forest, home of the Cherusci, with the Bructeri and others bordering the river. These tribes were among the initial Franks. The Romans were quite interested in adding them to the empire, and to that end built a fort, Amisia, at the mouth of the Ems. As the river was navigable to their ships, they hoped to use it to access the tribes at its upper end.

Surrounding the river for most of its length, however, were swamps, bogs and marshes. The Romans found they had no place to stand, could not pick the most favourable ground, because there was none, and could not in general follow the strategies and tactics developed by the Roman army. They were stopped at the Battle of Teutoburg Forest, 9 AD, and were checked again 6 years later. The Ems became a road leading nowhere for them, nor were they ever able to bridge the swamps satisfactorily with causeways.

The Dollart Bay near Emden did not exist until 1277, when a catastrophic storm surge flooded 43 parishes and killed an estimated 80,000 people. Most of the land lost in that flood has been reclaimed in a series of initiatives from the 16th to the early 20th centuries. The river in 1277 curved north by Emden, covering the area of the current Emden harbor complex.

Construction of canals in more modern times connected the Ems to other waterways, opening it as a highway of industrial transportation.

== River islands ==
- Bingumer Sand
