= Dohren, Emsland =

Dohren
- Municipality
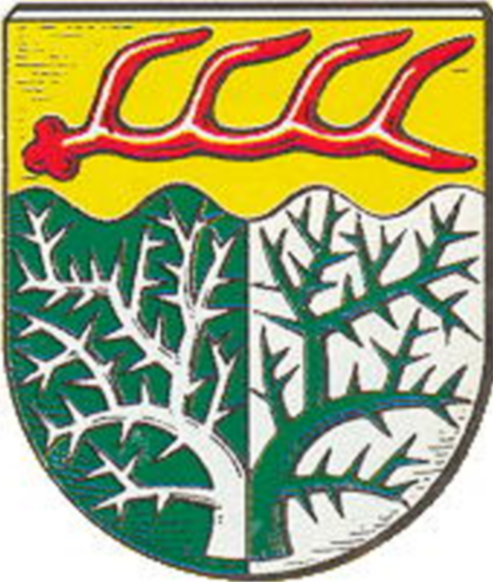
- Coat of arms

- Location of Dohren within Emsland district
- Interactive map of Dohren
- Location within Germany Location within Lower Saxony
- Coordinates: 52°38′N 07°34′E
- Country: Germany
- State: Lower Saxony
- District: Emsland
- Municipal assoc.: Herzlake

Government
  - Mayor: Johannes Dieker

Area
  - Total: 25.64 km^{2} (9.90 sq mi)
- Elevation: 25 m (82 ft)

Population (2025-12-31)
  - Total: 1,150
  - Density: 44.9/km^{2} (116/sq mi)
- Time zone: UTC+01:00 (CET)
  - Summer (DST): UTC+02:00 (CEST)
- Postal codes: 49770
- Dialling codes: 05962
- Vehicle registration: EL

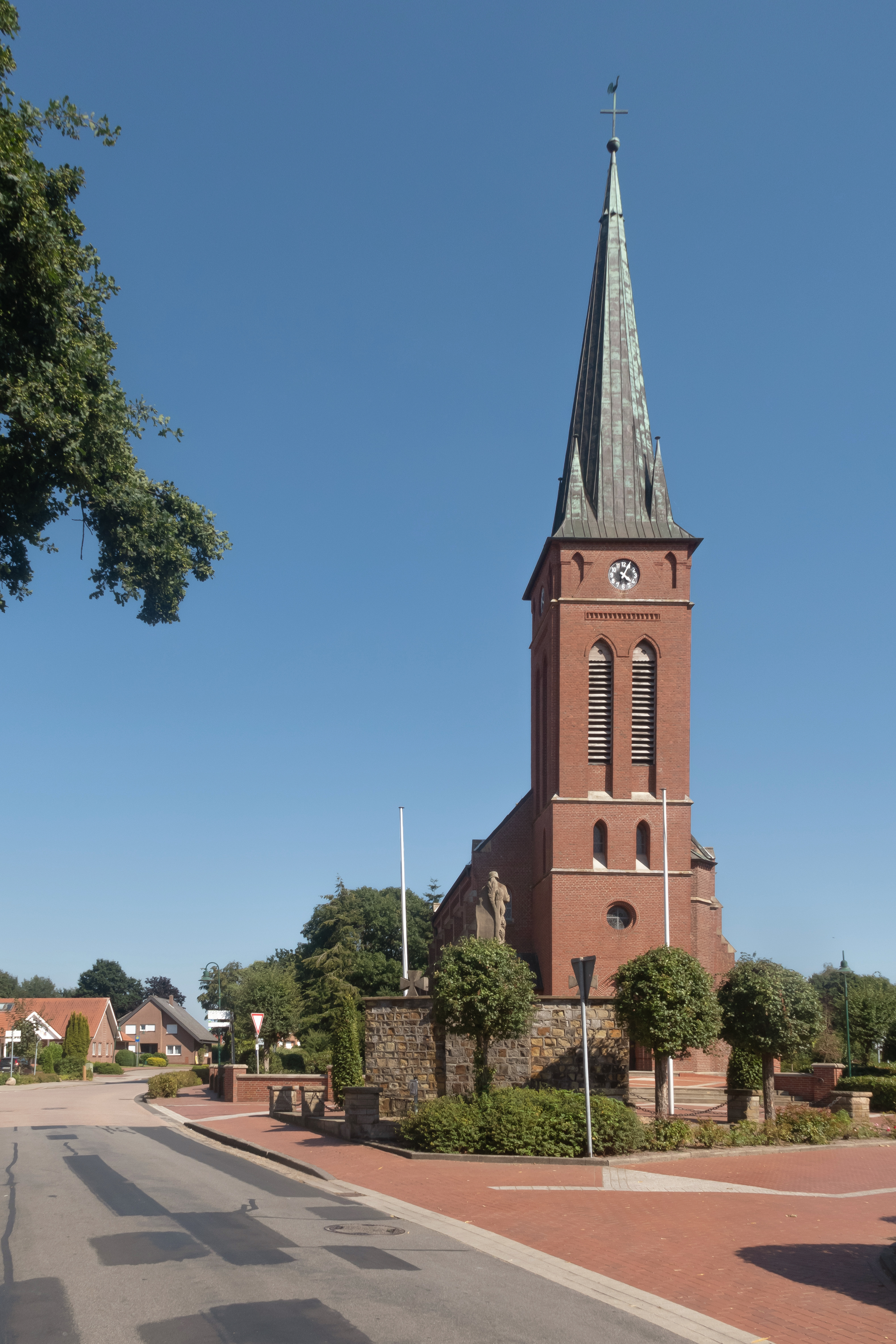
Church: Sankt Bernardus Kirche

Dohren (German pronunciation: [ˈdoːʁən]) is a municipality in the Emsland district, in Lower Saxony, Germany.
