= Lengerich (Samtgemeinde) =

- Samtgemeinde
- Location of Lengerich within Emsland district
- Interactive map of Lengerich
- Location within Germany Location within Lower Saxony
- Coordinates: 52°32′N 7°31′E
- Country: Germany
- State: Lower Saxony
- District: Emsland
- Seat: Lengerich
- Subdivisions: 6 municipalities

Area
  - Total: 142.85 km^{2} (55.15 sq mi)

Population (2025-12-31)
  - Total: 9,500
  - Density: 67/km^{2} (170/sq mi)
- Time zone: UTC+01:00 (CET)
  - Summer (DST): UTC+02:00 (CEST)
- Website: www.lengerich-emsland.de

Lengerich is a Samtgemeinde in the district Emsland in Lower Saxony, Germany. Its seat is in the municipality Lengerich.

The Samtgemeinde Lengerich consists of the following municipalities:

1. Bawinkel
2. Gersten
3. Handrup
4. Langen
5. Lengerich
6. Wettrup

== Gallery ==
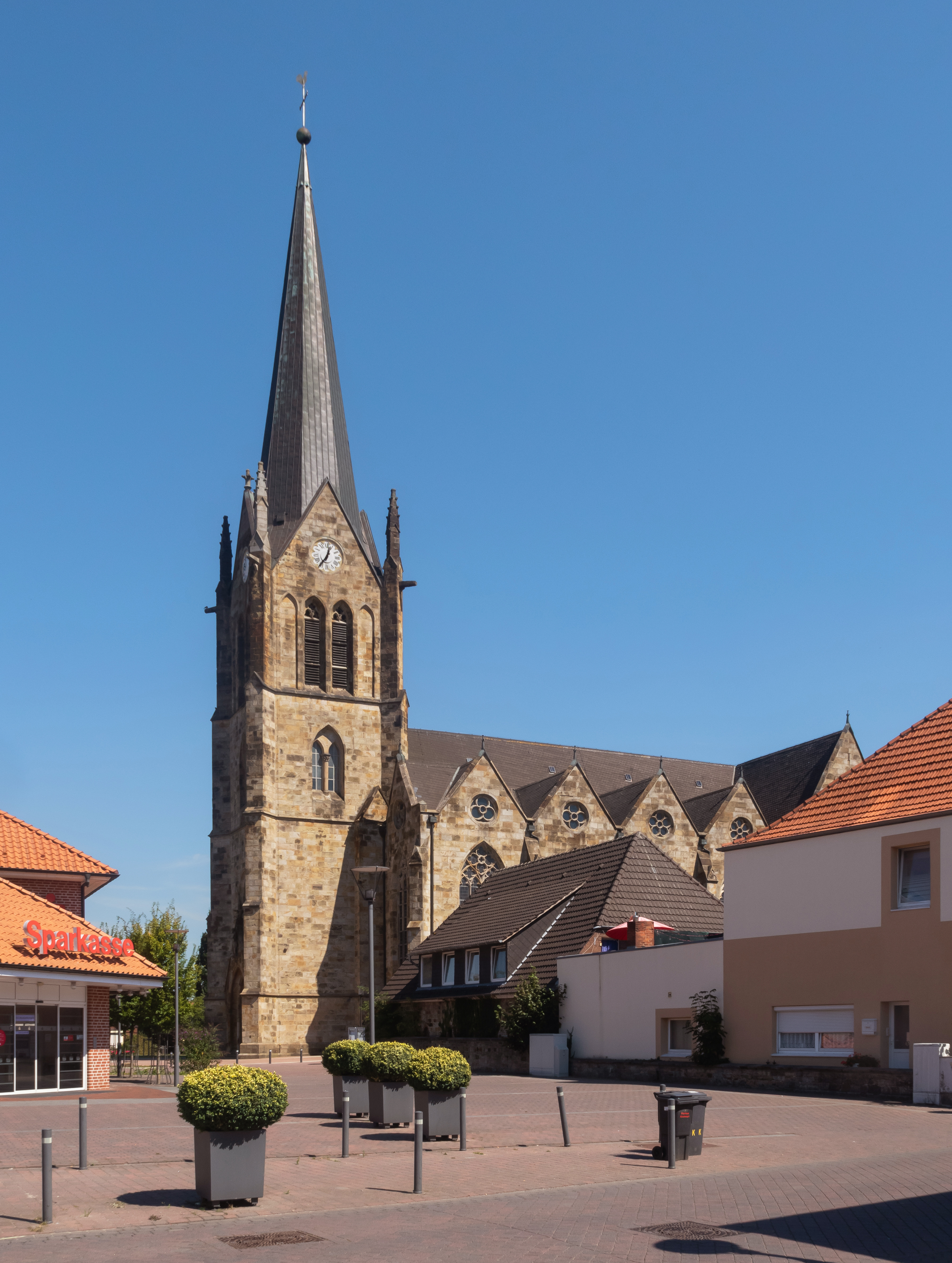
Lengerich, church: Sankt Benedict Kirche

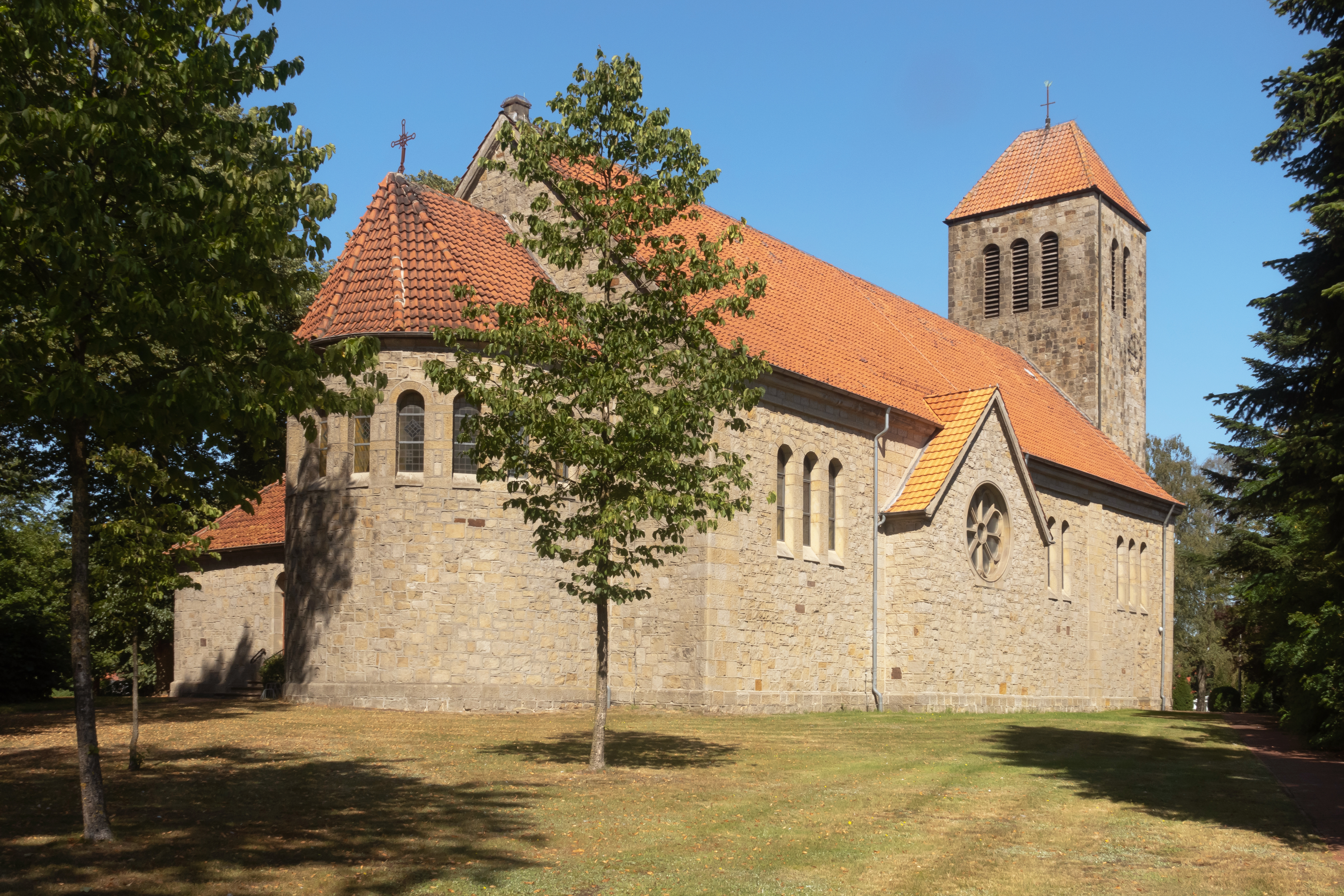
Gersten, church: Herz Jesu Kirche

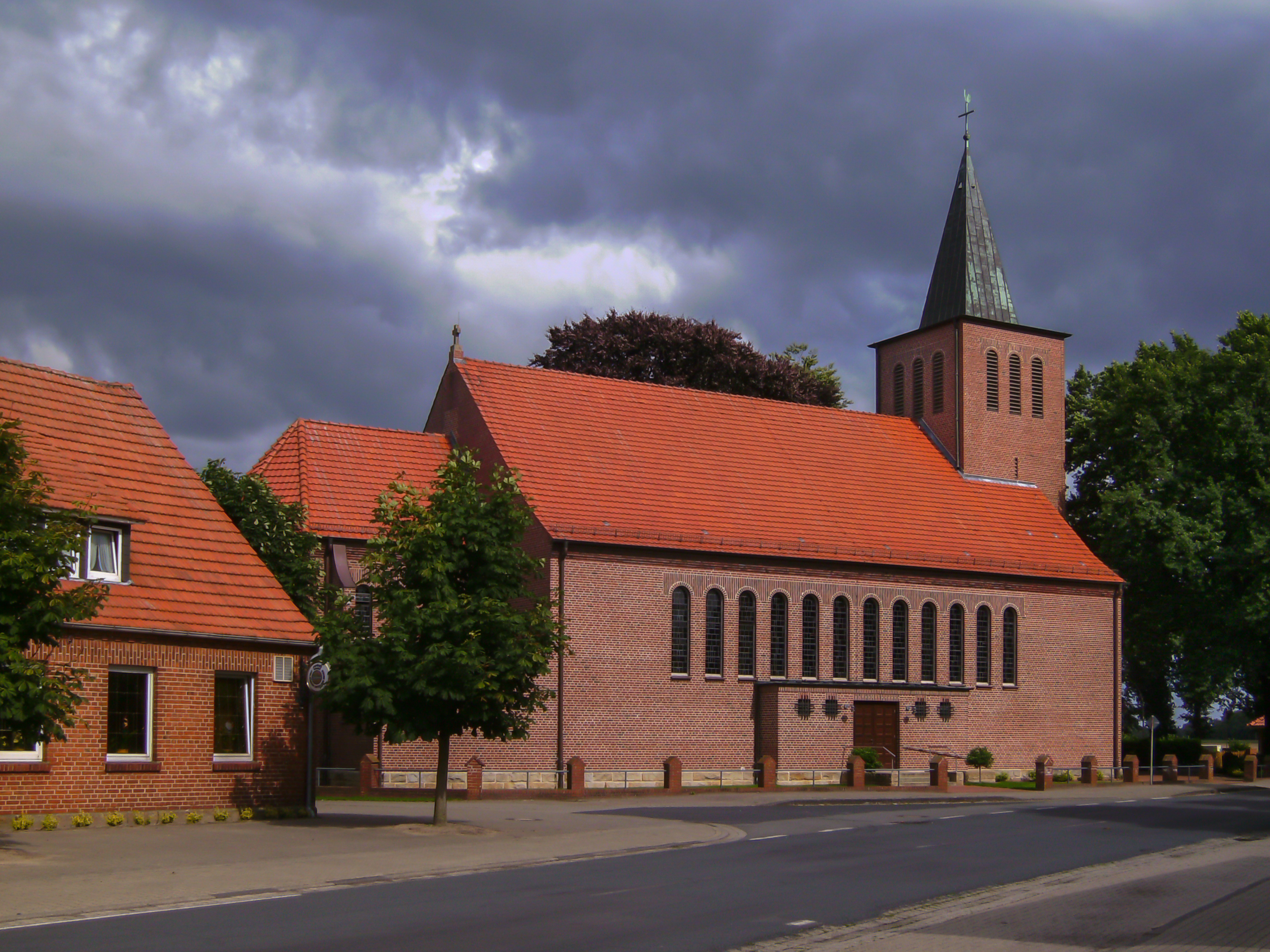
Wettrup, church
