= Neulehe =

- Municipality
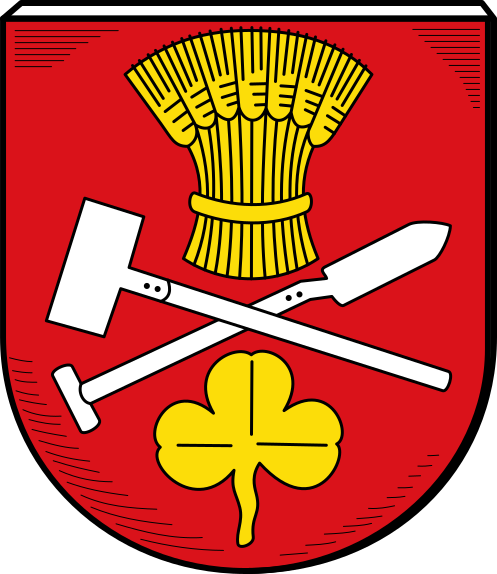
- Coat of arms

- Location of Neulehe within Emsland district
- Interactive map of Neulehe
- Location within Germany Location within Lower Saxony
- Coordinates: 53°00′N 07°24′E
- Country: Germany
- State: Lower Saxony
- District: Emsland
- Municipal assoc.: Dörpen

Government
  - Mayor: Reinhard Gansefort (CDU)

Area
  - Total: 13.62 km^{2} (5.26 sq mi)
- Elevation: 8 m (26 ft)

Population (2025-12-31)
  - Total: 840
  - Density: 62/km^{2} (160/sq mi)
- Time zone: UTC+01:00 (CET)
  - Summer (DST): UTC+02:00 (CEST)
- Postal codes: 26909
- Dialling codes: 0 49 68
- Vehicle registration: EL

Neulehe is a municipality in the Emsland district, in Lower Saxony, Germany.
