= Gersten =

- Municipality
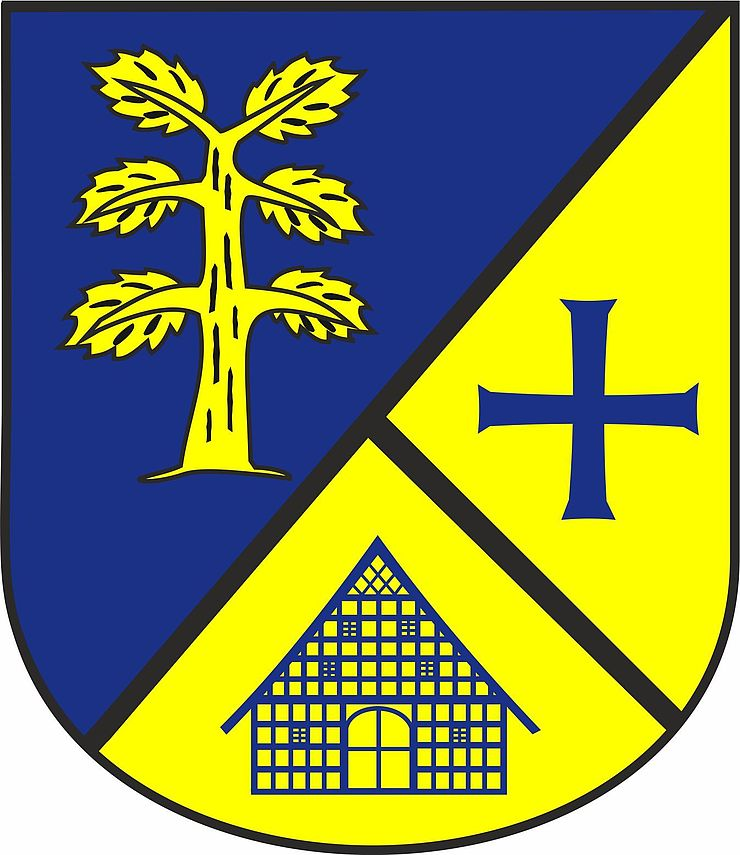
- Coat of arms

- Location of Gersten within Emsland district
- Interactive map of Gersten
- Location within Germany Location within Lower Saxony
- Coordinates: 52°35′N 07°31′E
- Country: Germany
- State: Lower Saxony
- District: Emsland
- Municipal assoc.: Lengerich

Government
  - Mayor: Aloys Bregen-Meiners (CDU)

Area
  - Total: 28.83 km^{2} (11.13 sq mi)
- Elevation: 24 m (79 ft)

Population (2025-12-31)
  - Total: 1,199
  - Density: 41.59/km^{2} (107.7/sq mi)
- Time zone: UTC+01:00 (CET)
  - Summer (DST): UTC+02:00 (CEST)
- Postal codes: 49838
- Dialling codes: 05904
- Vehicle registration: EL
- Website: www.gersten.de

Gersten is a municipality in the Emsland district, in Lower Saxony, Germany.
