= Langen, Emsland =

Langen
- Municipality
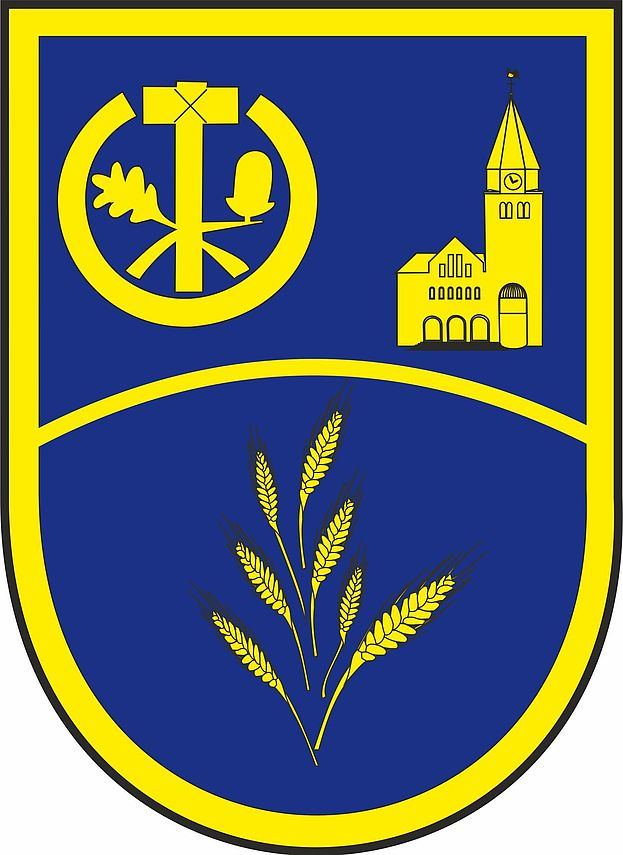
- Coat of arms

- Location of Langen within Emsland district
- Interactive map of Langen
- Location within Germany Location within Lower Saxony
- Coordinates: 52°32′30″N 7°28′7″E
- Country: Germany
- State: Lower Saxony
- District: Emsland
- Municipal assoc.: Lengerich

Government
  - Mayor: Franz Uhlenberg (CDU)

Area
  - Total: 33.53 km^{2} (12.95 sq mi)
- Elevation: 47 m (154 ft)

Population (2025-12-31)
  - Total: 1,375
  - Density: 41.01/km^{2} (106.2/sq mi)
- Time zone: UTC+01:00 (CET)
  - Summer (DST): UTC+02:00 (CEST)
- Postal codes: 49838
- Dialling codes: 05904
- Vehicle registration: EL

Langen (German pronunciation: [ˈlaŋən]) is a municipality in the Emsland district, in Lower Saxony, Germany.
