= Bawinkel =

- Municipality
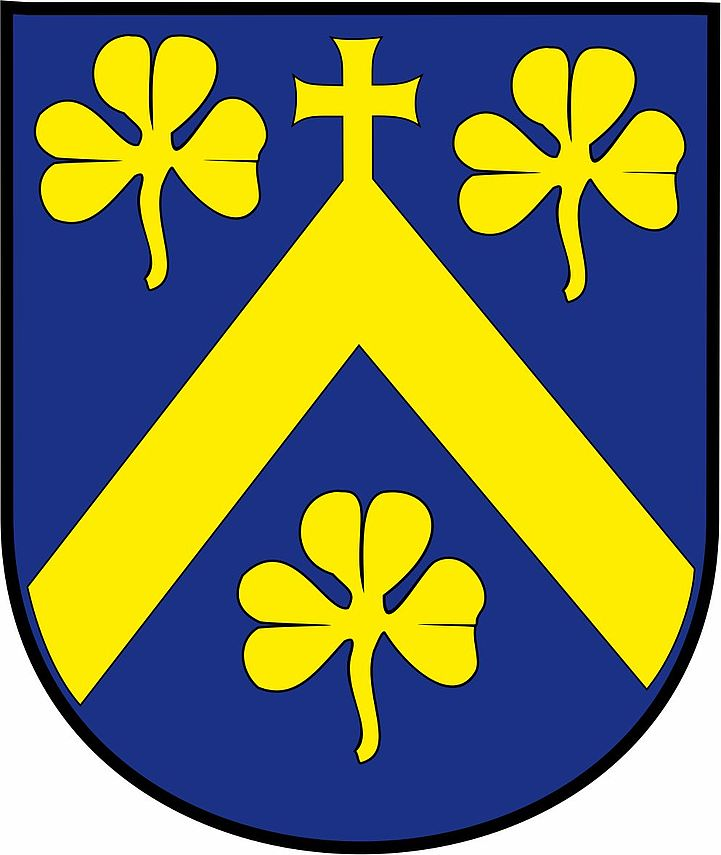
- Coat of arms

- Location of Bawinkel within Emsland district
- Interactive map of Bawinkel
- Location within Germany Location within Lower Saxony
- Coordinates: 52°36′N 07°31′E
- Country: Germany
- State: Lower Saxony
- District: Emsland
- Municipal assoc.: Lengerich

Government
  - Mayor: Adolf Böcker (CDU)

Area
  - Total: 20.34 km^{2} (7.85 sq mi)
- Elevation: 21 m (69 ft)

Population (2025-12-31)
  - Total: 2,707
  - Density: 133.1/km^{2} (344.7/sq mi)
- Time zone: UTC+01:00 (CET)
  - Summer (DST): UTC+02:00 (CEST)
- Postal codes: 49844
- Dialling codes: 0 59 63
- Vehicle registration: EL
- Website: www.bawinkel.de

Bawinkel is a municipality in the Emsland district, in Lower Saxony, Germany.

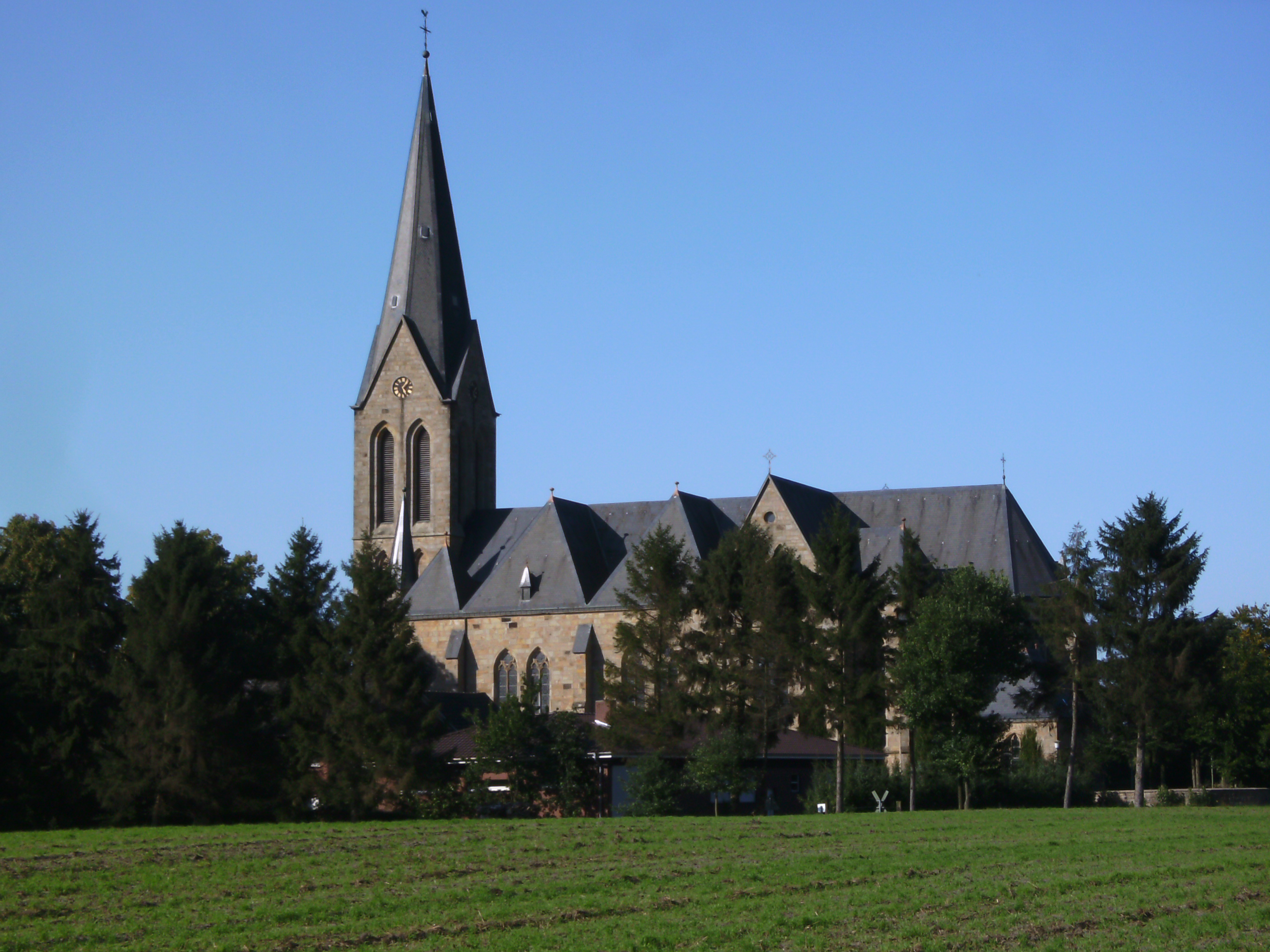
Church: Sankt Alexander Kirche
