= Herzlake (Samtgemeinde) =

- Samtgemeinde
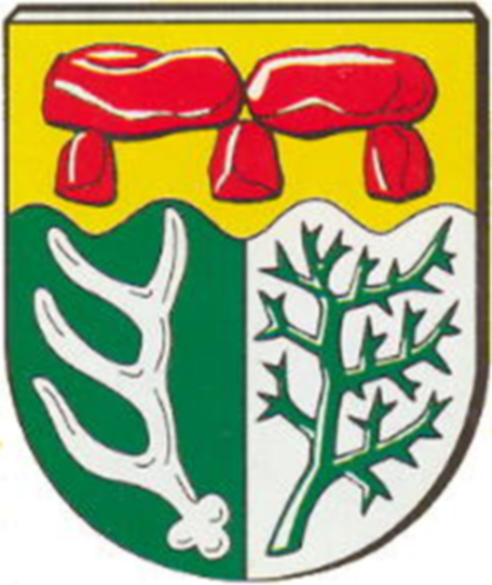
- Coat of arms

- Location of Herzlake within Emsland district
- Interactive map of Herzlake
- Location within Germany Location within Lower Saxony
- Coordinates: 52°42′N 7°35′E
- Country: Germany
- State: Lower Saxony
- District: Emsland

Government
  - Mayor (2021–26): Martina Schümers

Area
  - Total: 155.3 km^{2} (60.0 sq mi)
- Elevation: 20–34 m (66–112 ft)

Population (2025-12-31)
  - Total: 10,531
  - Density: 67.81/km^{2} (175.6/sq mi)
- Time zone: UTC+01:00 (CET)
  - Summer (DST): UTC+02:00 (CEST)
- Postal codes: 49770 (Herzlake a. Dohren); 49774 (Lähden)
- Dialling codes: 05962 (Herzlake a. Dohren); 05964 (Lähden); 05432 (Vinnen)
- Vehicle registration: EL
- Website: herzlake.de

Samtgemeinde Herzlake is a Samtgemeinde in the district Emsland in Lower Saxony, Germany at the Hase river.

The Samtgemeinde Herzlake consists of the following municipalities (population as of 2025):

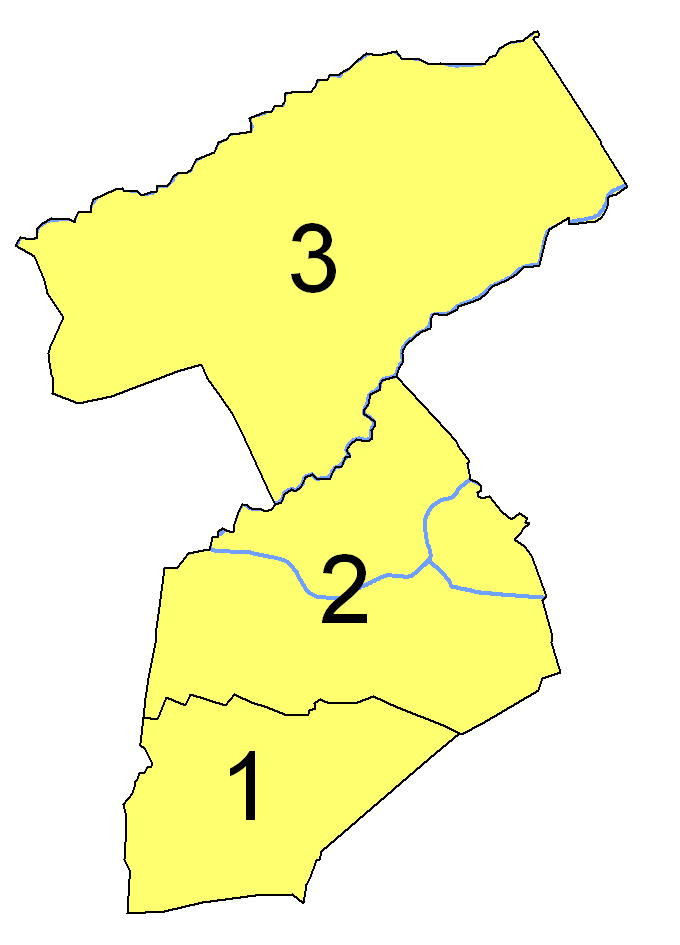
1. Dohren (1,152)
2. Herzlake (4,803)
3. Lähden (4,557)
