= Dörpen (Samtgemeinde) =

- Samtgemeinde
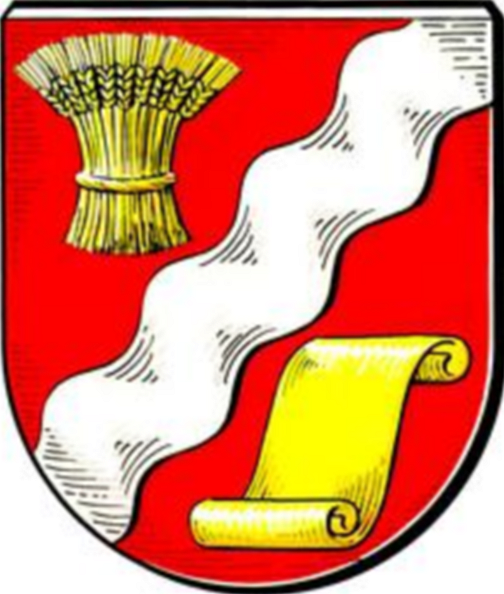
- Coat of arms

- Location of Dörpen within Emsland district
- Interactive map of Dörpen
- Location within Germany Location within Lower Saxony
- Coordinates: 52°57′N 7°18′E
- Country: Germany
- State: Lower Saxony
- District: Emsland

Government
  - Mayor (2019–24): Hermann Wocken (CDU)

Area
  - Total: 209.0 km^{2} (80.7 sq mi)
- Elevation: 6 m (20 ft)

Population (2025-12-31)
  - Total: 17,402
  - Density: 83.26/km^{2} (215.7/sq mi)
- Time zone: UTC+01:00 (CET)
  - Summer (DST): UTC+02:00 (CEST)
- Vehicle registration: EL
- Website: doerpen.de

Samtgemeinde Dörpen is a Samtgemeinde in the district Emsland in Lower Saxony, Germany.

The Samtgemeinde Dörpen consists of the following municipalities (populations as of January 2026):

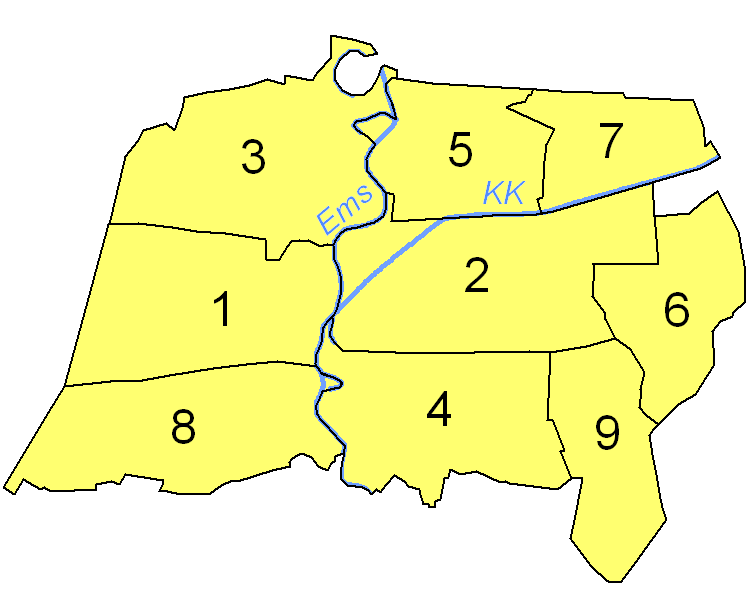

1. Dersum (1,507)
2. Dörpen (5,956)
3. Heede (2,702)
4. Kluse (1,848)
5. Lehe (1,014)
6. Neubörger (1,647)
7. Neulehe (868)
8. Walchum (1,837)
9. Wippingen (1,030)
