= Walchum =

- Municipality
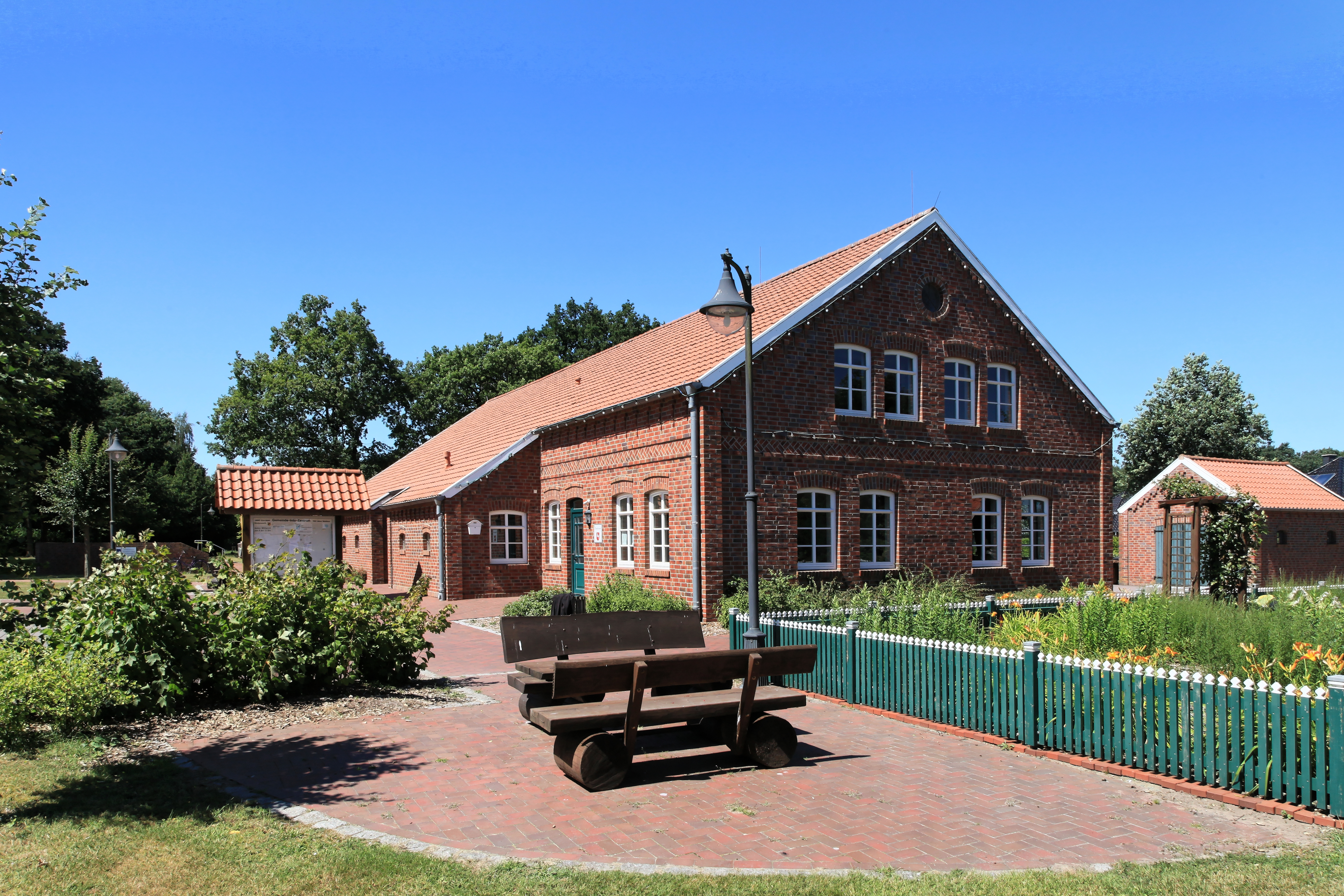

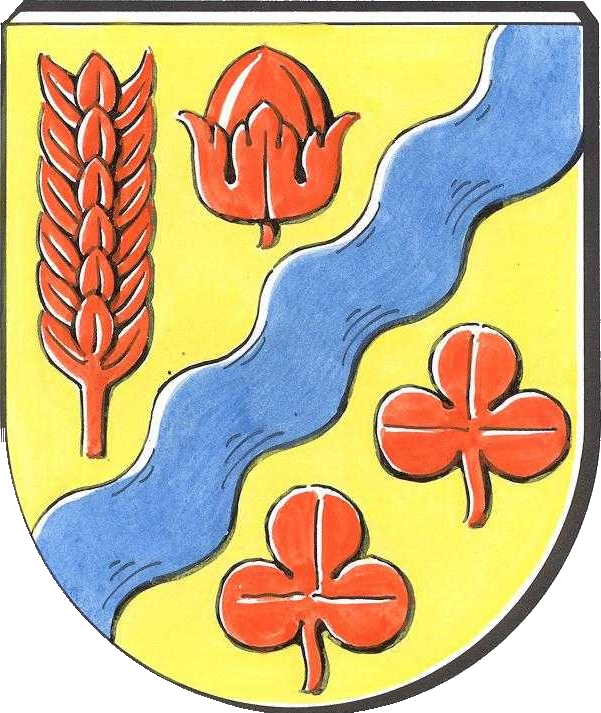
- Coat of arms

- Location of Walchum within Emsland district
- Interactive map of Walchum
- Location within Germany Location within Lower Saxony
- Coordinates: 52°55′49″N 7°16′15″E
- Country: Germany
- State: Lower Saxony
- District: Emsland
- Municipal assoc.: Dörpen

Government
  - Mayor: Alois Milsch (CDU)

Area
  - Total: 26.5 km^{2} (10.2 sq mi)
- Elevation: 6 m (20 ft)

Population (2025-12-31)
  - Total: 1,736
  - Density: 65.5/km^{2} (170/sq mi)
- Time zone: UTC+01:00 (CET)
  - Summer (DST): UTC+02:00 (CEST)
- Postal codes: 26907
- Dialling codes: 04963
- Vehicle registration: EL
- Website: www.Walchum.de

Walchum (German pronunciation: [ˈvalçʊm]) is a municipality in the Emsland district, in Lower Saxony, Germany.
