= Lünne =

- Municipality
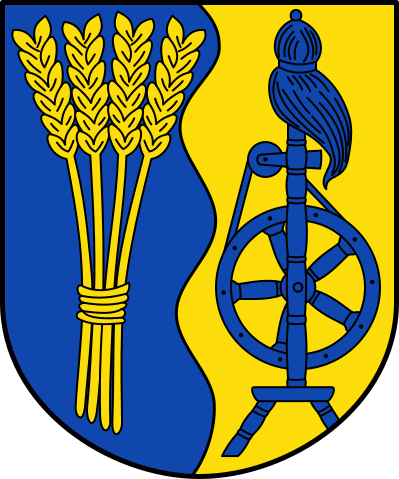
- Flag Coat of arms

- Location of Lünne within Emsland district
- Interactive map of Lünne
- Location within Germany Location within Lower Saxony
- Coordinates: 52°25′56″N 7°25′34″E
- Country: Germany
- State: Lower Saxony
- District: Emsland
- Municipal assoc.: Spelle

Government
  - Mayor: Magdalena Wilmes

Area
  - Total: 30.26 km^{2} (11.68 sq mi)
- Elevation: 32 m (105 ft)

Population (2025-12-31)
  - Total: 2,132
  - Density: 70.46/km^{2} (182.5/sq mi)
- Time zone: UTC+01:00 (CET)
  - Summer (DST): UTC+02:00 (CEST)
- Postal codes: 48480
- Dialling codes: 0 59 06
- Vehicle registration: EL
- Website: www.luenne.de

Lünne (German pronunciation: [ˈlʏnə]) is a municipality in the Emsland district, in Lower Saxony, Germany.
