= Lengerich, Emsland =

Lengerich
- Municipality
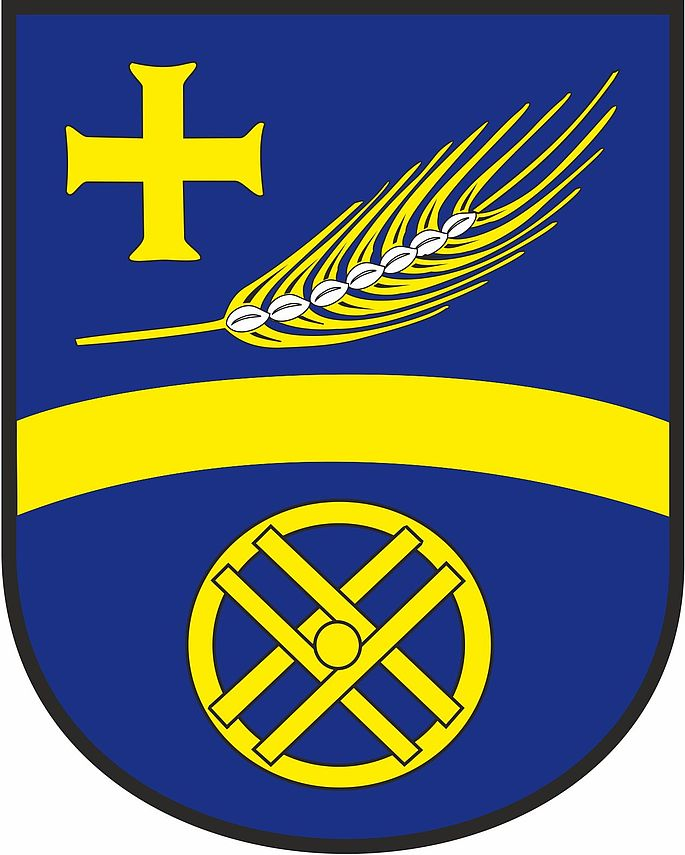
- Coat of arms

- Location of Lengerich within Emsland district
- Interactive map of Lengerich
- Location within Germany Location within Lower Saxony
- Coordinates: 52°33′N 7°32′E
- Country: Germany
- State: Lower Saxony
- District: Emsland
- Municipal assoc.: Lengerich

Government
  - Mayor: Gerhard Wübbe (CDU)

Area
  - Total: 31.73 km^{2} (12.25 sq mi)
- Elevation: 41 m (135 ft)

Population (2025-12-31)
  - Total: 2,857
  - Density: 90.04/km^{2} (233.2/sq mi)
- Time zone: UTC+01:00 (CET)
  - Summer (DST): UTC+02:00 (CEST)
- Postal codes: 49838
- Dialling codes: 05904
- Vehicle registration: EL
- Website: www.lengerich-emsland.de

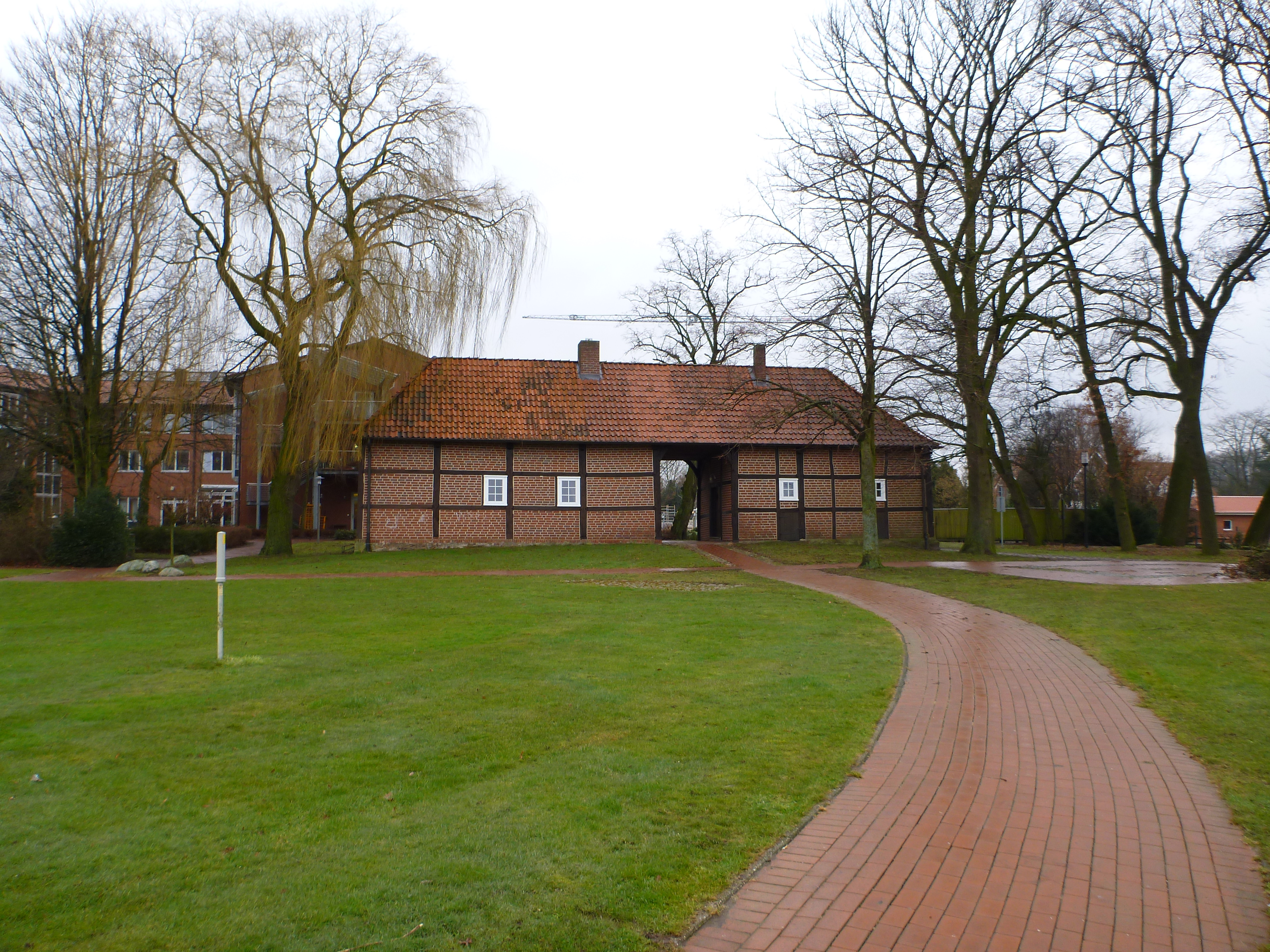
Gatehouse of the former Burg Lengerich

Lengerich (German pronunciation: [ˈlɛŋəʁɪç]) is a municipality in the Emsland district, in Lower Saxony, Germany. It is situated approximately 15 km east of Lingen.

Lengerich is the seat of the Samtgemeinde ("collective municipality") Lengerich.

== People ==
- Johannes Wübbe (born 1966), German Roman Catholic auxiliary bishop
