= Handrup =

- Municipality
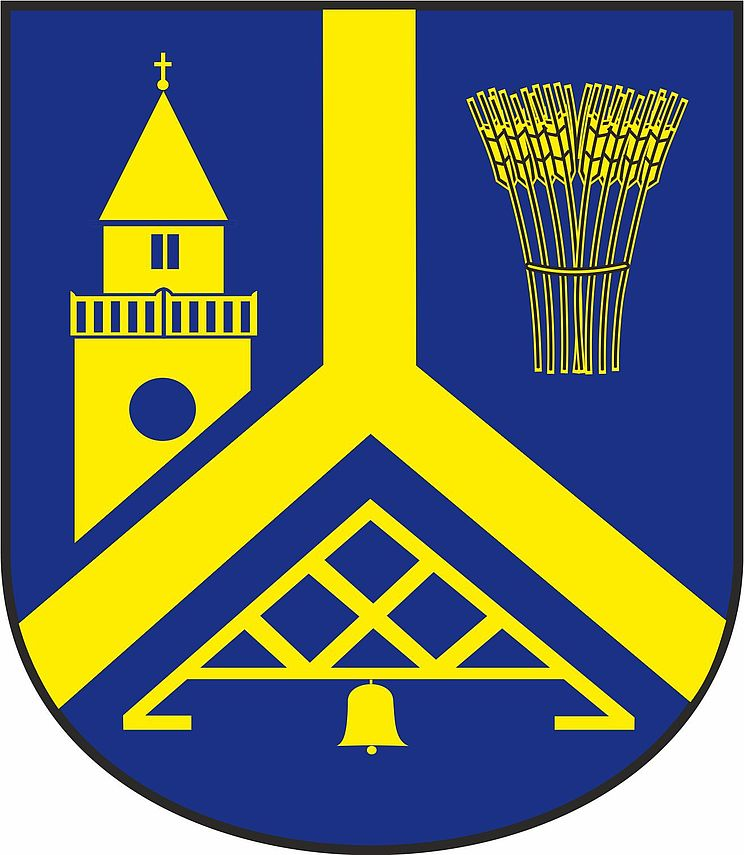
- Coat of arms

- Location of Handrup within Emsland district
- Interactive map of Handrup
- Location within Germany Location within Lower Saxony
- Coordinates: 52°33′42″N 07°34′36″E
- Country: Germany
- State: Lower Saxony
- District: Emsland
- Municipal assoc.: Lengerich

Government
  - Mayor: Josef Mauentöppen (CDU)

Area
  - Total: 14.60 km^{2} (5.64 sq mi)
- Elevation: 28 m (92 ft)

Population (2025-12-31)
  - Total: 831
  - Density: 56.9/km^{2} (147/sq mi)
- Time zone: UTC+01:00 (CET)
  - Summer (DST): UTC+02:00 (CEST)
- Postal codes: 49838
- Dialling codes: 05904
- Vehicle registration: EL
- Website: www.handrup.de

Handrup is a municipality in the Emsland district, in Lower Saxony, Germany.
