= Salzbergen =

- Municipality
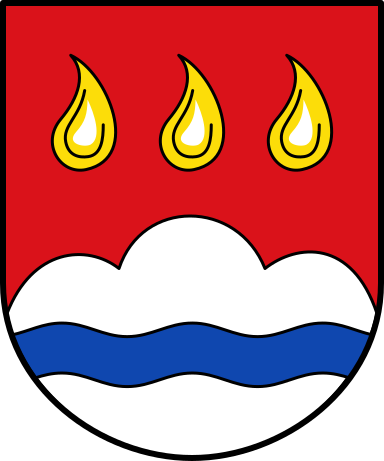
- Flag Coat of arms

- Location of Salzbergen within Emsland district
- Interactive map of Salzbergen
- Location within Germany Location within Lower Saxony
- Coordinates: 52°19′28″N 07°20′53″E
- Country: Germany
- State: Lower Saxony
- District: Emsland

Government
  - Mayor (2019–24): Andreas Kaiser (CDU)

Area
  - Total: 53.31 km^{2} (20.58 sq mi)
- Elevation: 38 m (125 ft)

Population (2025-12-31)
  - Total: 7,962
  - Density: 149.4/km^{2} (386.8/sq mi)
- Time zone: UTC+01:00 (CET)
  - Summer (DST): UTC+02:00 (CEST)
- Postal codes: 48499
- Dialling codes: 05976
- Vehicle registration: EL
- Website: www.salzbergen.de

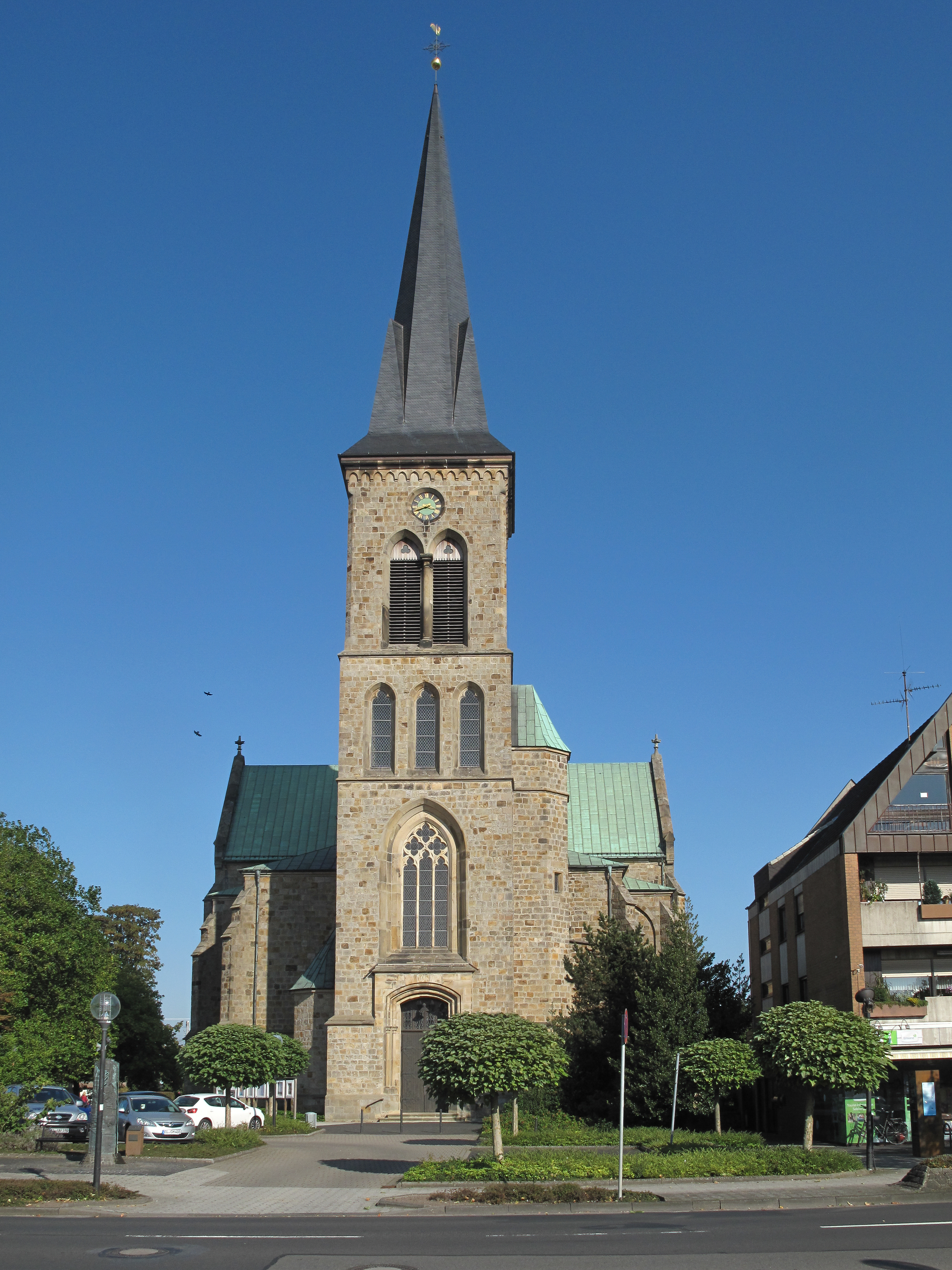
Salzbergen, church: Kirche Sankt Cyriakus

Salzbergen (Dutch:Zoutbergen) is a municipality in the Emsland district, Lower Saxony, Germany. It is situated on the river Ems, approx. 25 km south of Lingen, and 10 km northwest of Rheine.

It has the oldest oil refinery in the world, opened in 1860.

Salzbergen station is on the Emsland Railway.
