= IHK Osnabrück – Emsland – Grafschaft Bentheim =

The Industrie- und Handelskammer Osnabrück – Emsland – Grafschaft Bentheim (Chamber of Industry and Commerce – abbreviated to IHK) is one of 80 Chambers of Industry and Commerce in Germany, representing the collective interests of regional businesses. The districts of Bentheim, Emsland (excluding the city of Papenburg, which is served by the IHK for East Frisia and Papenburg) and Osnabrück – including the city of Osnabrück – belong to the area covered by this IHK, which represents more than 50,000 businesses in the region. A total of 450 businesspeople are involved with the elected IHK committees; meanwhile 2,000 people are active as honorary auditors. The IHK Osnabrück – Emsland – Grafschaft Bentheim employs an additional 75 people.

== Self-management of economy ==
The IHK is a public corporation, assigned by the state with the task of self-managing the region’s economy and industry. It is jointly represented by its president, Martin Schlichter, and its managing director, Marco Graf. The basis of the IHK’s work is encouraging businesses in the region to engage themselves in an honorary capacity in committees and other forums.

== Duties ==
A key duty of the IHK is officially appointing and administering oaths to experts in particular fields. As regards the field of fiscal valuation of real estate, it has been largely absolved of these duties by EU personal certification standards pursuant to DIN ISO EN 17024.

== 2011 renaming ==
Having formerly gone by the name of IHK Osnabrück-Emsland, since 2011 the organisation has been called the IHK Osnabrück – Emsland – Grafschaft Bentheim. The renaming was carried out to emphasise the IHK’s representation of all its member regions.

== Links ==
- IHK Osnabrück – Emsland – Grafschaft Bentheim homepage
