= Wettrup =

- Municipality
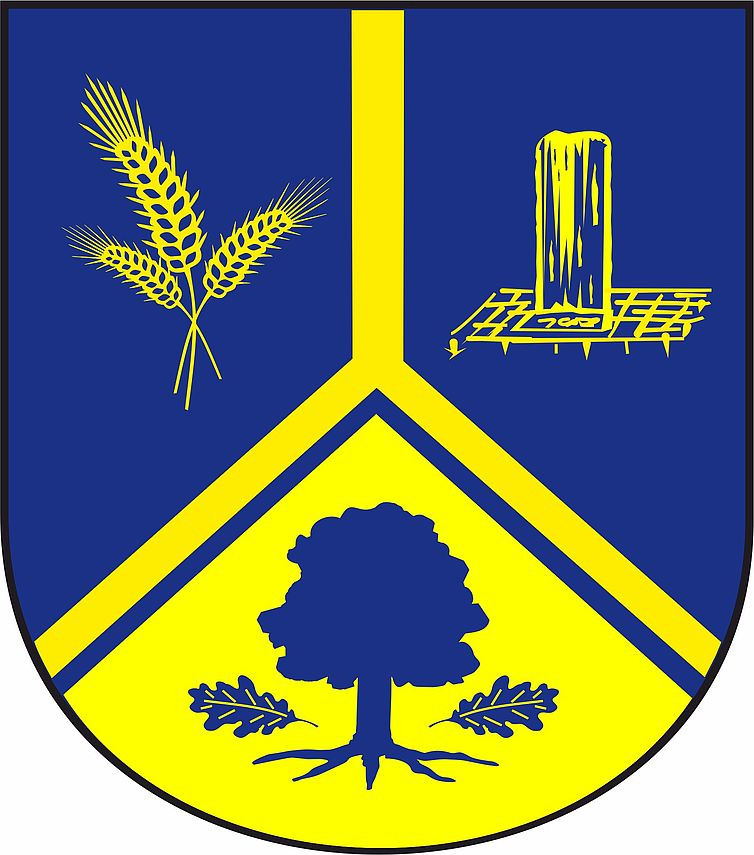
- Coat of arms

- Location of Wettrup within Emsland district
- Interactive map of Wettrup
- Location within Germany Location within Lower Saxony
- Coordinates: 52°34′N 07°35′E
- Country: Germany
- State: Lower Saxony
- District: Emsland
- Municipal assoc.: Lengerich

Government
  - Mayor: Hermann Berning (CDU)

Area
  - Total: 13.8 km^{2} (5.3 sq mi)
- Elevation: 28 m (92 ft)

Population (2025-12-31)
  - Total: 531
  - Density: 38.5/km^{2} (99.7/sq mi)
- Time zone: UTC+01:00 (CET)
  - Summer (DST): UTC+02:00 (CEST)
- Postal codes: 49838
- Dialling codes: 0 59 09
- Vehicle registration: EL
- Website: www.wettrup.de

Wettrup is a municipality in the Emsland district, in Lower Saxony, Germany.

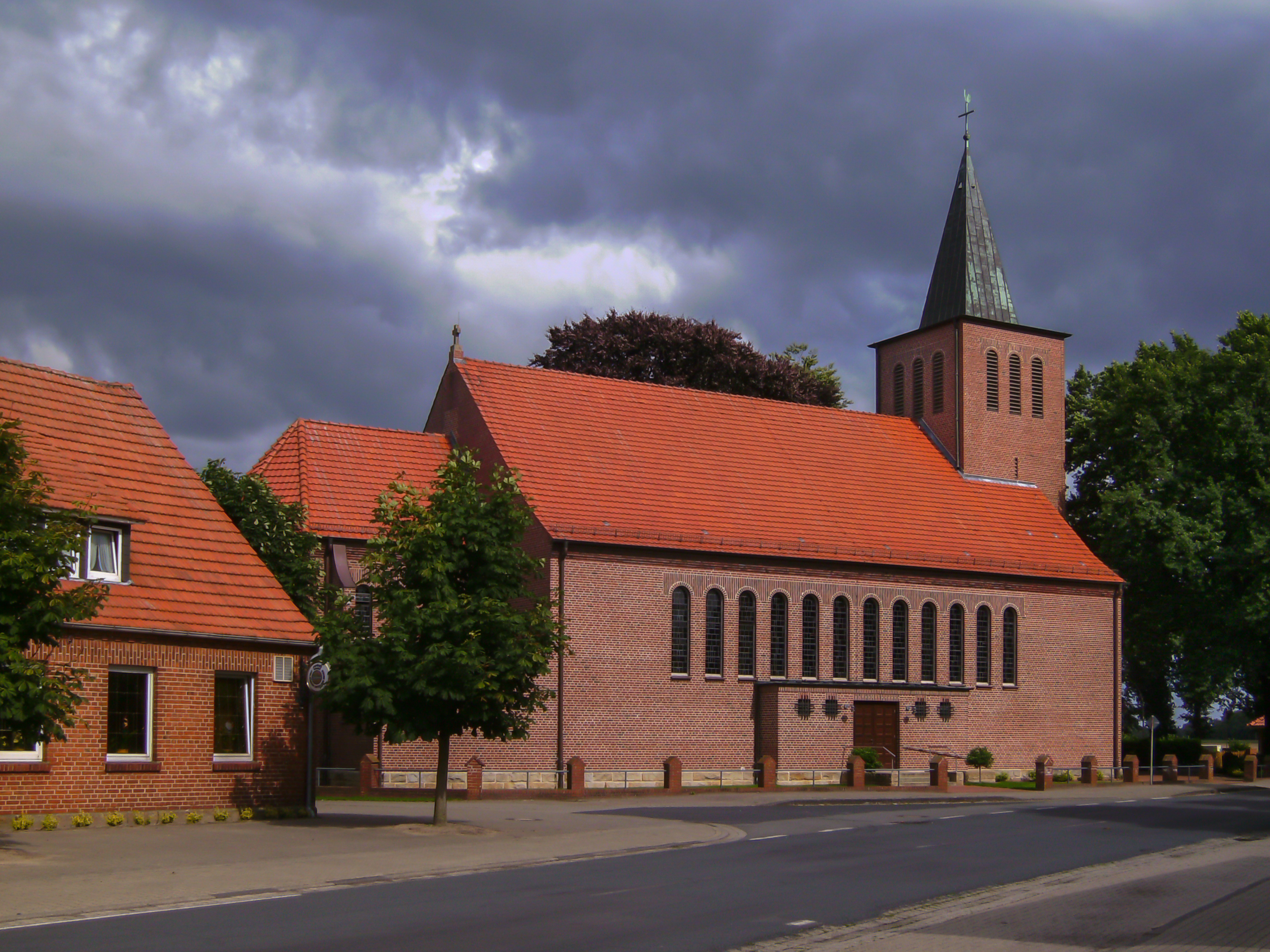
Wettrup, church
