= Neubörger =

- Municipality
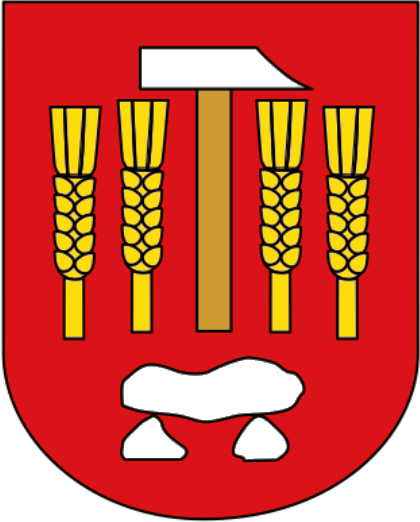
- Coat of arms

- Location of Neubörger within Emsland district
- Interactive map of Neubörger
- Location within Germany Location within Lower Saxony
- Coordinates: 52°58′N 7°27′E
- Country: Germany
- State: Lower Saxony
- District: Emsland
- Municipal assoc.: Dörpen

Government
  - Mayor: Ulrich Müller

Area
  - Total: 16.49 km^{2} (6.37 sq mi)
- Elevation: 16 m (52 ft)

Population (2025-12-31)
  - Total: 1,596
  - Density: 96.79/km^{2} (250.7/sq mi)
- Time zone: UTC+01:00 (CET)
  - Summer (DST): UTC+02:00 (CEST)
- Postal codes: 26909
- Dialling codes: 04966
- Vehicle registration: EL
- Website: www.gemeinde-neuboerger.de

Neubörger is a municipality in the Emsland district, in Lower Saxony, Germany.
