= Schapen =

- Municipality
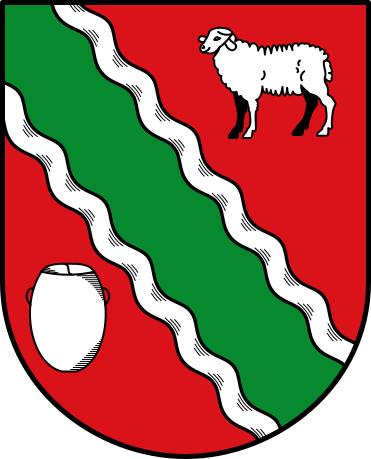
- Flag Coat of arms

- Location of Schapen within Emsland district
- Interactive map of Schapen
- Location within Germany Location within Lower Saxony
- Coordinates: 52°23′N 7°34′E
- Country: Germany
- State: Lower Saxony
- District: Emsland
- Municipal assoc.: Spelle

Government
  - Mayor: Franz Austermann (CDU)

Area
  - Total: 26.63 km^{2} (10.28 sq mi)
- Elevation: 38 m (125 ft)

Population (2025-12-31)
  - Total: 2,462
  - Density: 92.45/km^{2} (239.4/sq mi)
- Time zone: UTC+01:00 (CET)
  - Summer (DST): UTC+02:00 (CEST)
- Postal codes: 48480
- Dialling codes: 0 54 58
- Vehicle registration: EL

Schapen is a municipality in the Emsland district, in Lower Saxony, Germany.

== People ==
- Heiner Wilmer (born 1961), German Roman Catholic bishop
