= Emsland =

District in Lower Saxony, Germany

- District
- Flag Coat of arms
- Country: Germany
- State: Lower Saxony
- Capital: Meppen

Government
  - District admin.: Marc-André Burgdorf (CDU)

Area
  - Total: 2,881 km^{2} (1,112 sq mi)

Population (31 December 2025)
  - Total: 334,403
  - Density: 116.1/km^{2} (300.6/sq mi)
- Time zone: UTC+01:00 (CET)
  - Summer (DST): UTC+02:00 (CEST)
- Vehicle registration: EL
- Website: www.emsland.de

Landkreis Emsland (German: [ˈɛmsˌlant]) is a district in Lower Saxony, Germany named after the river Ems. It is bounded by (from the north and clockwise) the districts of Leer, Cloppenburg and Osnabrück, the state of North Rhine-Westphalia (district of Steinfurt), the district of Bentheim in Lower Saxony, and the Netherlands (provinces of Drenthe and Groningen).

== History ==
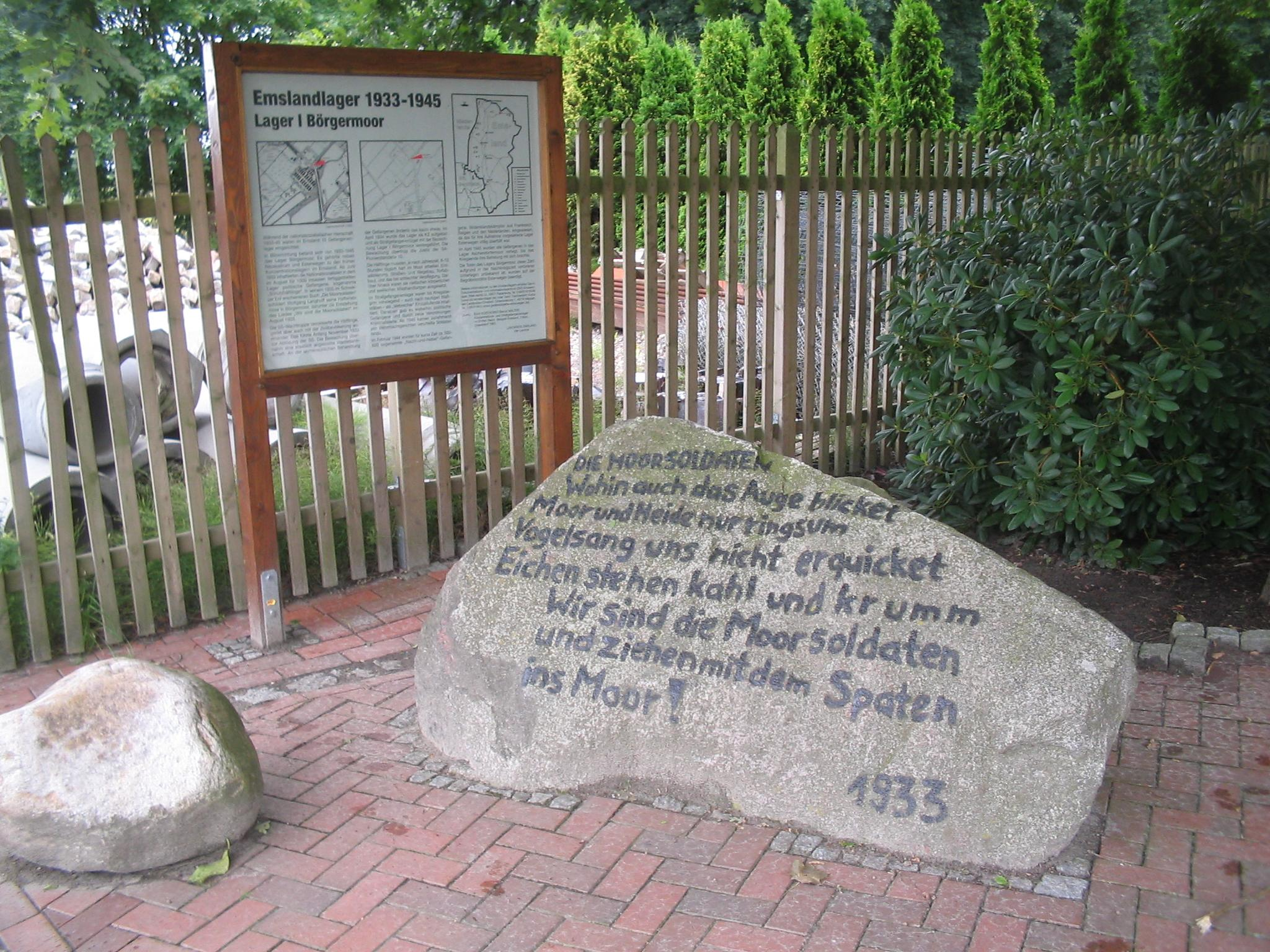
Memorial at the site of the entrance to the former Börgermoor concentration camp

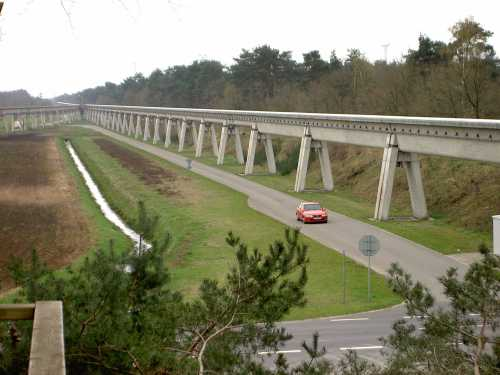
Transrapid test track

For a long time the region of the Emsland was extremely sparsely populated, due to the fens on both sides of the river. Small villages were established in medieval times along the river and on the Hümmling. In the 13th century the bishops of Münster gained control over the region; the Emsland remained property of the bishop until 1803, when the clerical states were dissolved. It came under the rule of Prussia and Arenberg, but after the Napoleonic Wars the Congress of Vienna decided to hand the territory over to the Kingdom of Hanover. The Duchy of Arenberg continued to exist as a fief of the Hanoverian kings. When Hanover was annexed by Prussia (1866), the dukes were deposed soon after (1875).

The now Prussian Province of Hanover was subdivided into districts in 1885; four districts were established on the territory of what is now the Landkreis Emsland. The districts were merged in 1977 to form the present district.

Under Nazi rule, labour camps known as the Emslandlager ("Emsland camps") held thousands of political opponents of the Nazi Party, located outside Börgermoor, now part of the commune Surwold, not far from Papenburg. A memorial of these camps, the Dokumentations- und Informationszentrum (DIZ) Emslandlager, is located at Papenburg. The well known resistance song "Peat Bog Soldiers" was composed by political prisoners at one of these camps.

In 1950 a governmental plan for the development of Emsland was adopted. Its aim was to turn the region into an industrial location. This was accomplished by draining the fens and establishing projects like the test track of the maglev "Transrapid" and several large shipyards such as the Meyer Werft in Papenburg. Although the Landkreis Emsland lost much of its original character, some areas retain their natural character, for example the Hümmling.

The 1977 district reforms in Lower Saxony united the former districts of Lingen, Meppen and Aschendorf-Hümmling in the district of Emsland, with Meppen as administrative seat. The Emsland remains a very Roman Catholic region compared to other parts of Lower Saxony.

== Geography ==
The district is located on the Dutch border. It is named after the Ems river, which crosses the region from south to north. It is an absolutely plain countryside, which was once full of fens. The only elevations are in the Hümmling, which is a hilly forest area east of the Ems.

Although the Emsland region is nowadays primarily a county among many others in Lower Saxony, its locals have what could be called a distinct sense of regional pride which will unlikely be found elsewhere in this state.

== Coat of arms ==
The coat of arms displays:

- a megalithic grave, typical for the Hümmling area
- the roses from the arms of the Duchy of Arenberg
- the anchor from the arms of the County of Lingen

The wavy line symbolises the river Ems.

== Cities and municipalities ==
Clickable map of towns and municipalities in the district

(Population 2005)

Free municipalities and towns

1. Emsbüren (9,749)
2. Geeste (11,279)
3. Haren, town (22,754)
4. Haselünne, town (12,549)
5. Lingen, town (51,318)
6. Meppen, town (34,196)
7. Papenburg, town (34,519)
8. Rhede (4,228)
9. Salzbergen (7,436)
10. Twist (9,640)

Samtgemeinden

11. Dörpen (15,446)
12. Freren (10,834)
13. Herzlake (9,821)
14. Lathen (10,815)
15. Lengerich (9,083)
16. Nordhümmling (12,149)
17. Sögel (15,484)
18. Spelle (12,653)
19. Werlte (15,660)

Dörpen

1. Dersum
2. Dörpen^{1}
3. Heede
4. Kluse
5. Lehe
6. Neubörger
7. Neulehe
8. Walchum
9. Wippingen

Freren

1. Andervenne
2. Beesten
3. Freren^{1, 2}
4. Messingen
5. Thuine

Herzlake

1. Dohren
2. Herzlake^{1}
3. Lähden

Lathen

1. Fresenburg
2. Lathen^{1}
3. Niederlangen
4. Oberlangen
5. Renkenberge
6. Sustrum

Lengerich

1. Bawinkel
2. Gersten
3. Handrup
4. Langen
5. Lengerich^{1}
6. Wettrup

Nordhümmling

1. Bockhorst
2. Breddenberg
3. Esterwegen^{1}
4. Hilkenbrook
5. Surwold

Sögel

1. Börger
2. Groß Berßen
3. Hüven
4. Klein Berßen
5. Sögel^{1}
6. Spahnharrenstätte
7. Stavern
8. Werpeloh

Spelle

1. Lünne
2. Schapen
3. Spelle^{1}

Werlte

1. Lahn
2. Lorup
3. Rastdorf
4. Vrees
5. Werlte^{1, 2}
^{1}seat of the Samtgemeinde; ^{2}town

== See also ==
- Exhibition Centre for the Archaeology of the Emsland, Meppen
- IHK Osnabrück – Emsland – Grafschaft Bentheim
