= Spelle (Samtgemeinde) =

- Samtgemeinde
- Location of Spelle within Emsland district
- Interactive map of Spelle
- Location within Germany Location within Lower Saxony
- Coordinates: 52°22′N 7°28′E
- Country: Germany
- State: Lower Saxony
- District: Emsland
- Seat: Spelle
- Subdivisions: 3 municipalities

Area
  - Total: 91.15 km^{2} (35.19 sq mi)

Population (2025-12-31)
  - Total: 14,421
  - Density: 158.2/km^{2} (409.8/sq mi)
- Time zone: UTC+01:00 (CET)
  - Summer (DST): UTC+02:00 (CEST)
- Website: www.spelle.de

Spelle is a Samtgemeinde in the district Emsland in Lower Saxony, Germany. Its seat is in the municipality Spelle.

The Samtgemeinde Spelle consists of the following municipalities:

1. Lünne
2. Schapen
3. Spelle
