= Spelle =

- Municipality
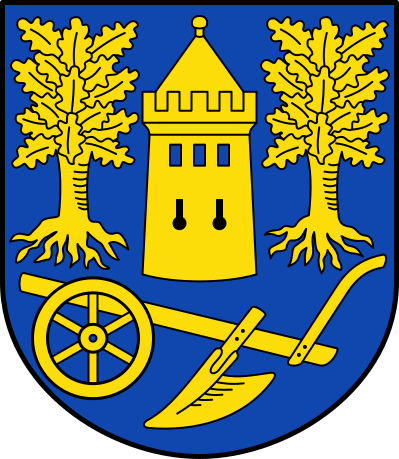
- Flag Coat of arms

- Location of Spelle within Emsland district
- Interactive map of Spelle
- Location within Germany Location within Lower Saxony
- Coordinates: 52°22′N 07°28′E
- Country: Germany
- State: Lower Saxony
- District: Emsland
- Municipal assoc.: Spelle

Government
  - Mayor: Andreas Wenninghoff (CDU)

Area
  - Total: 34.2 km^{2} (13.2 sq mi)
- Elevation: 35 m (115 ft)

Population (2025-12-31)
  - Total: 9,827
  - Density: 287/km^{2} (744/sq mi)
- Time zone: UTC+01:00 (CET)
  - Summer (DST): UTC+02:00 (CEST)
- Postal codes: 48480
- Dialling codes: 0 59 77
- Vehicle registration: EL
- Website: www.spelle.de

Spelle is a municipality in the Emsland district, in Lower Saxony, Germany. It is situated approximately 20 km southeast of Lingen, and 10 km north of Rheine.

Spelle is also the seat of the Samtgemeinde ("collective municipality") Spelle.
