= Lorup =

- Municipality
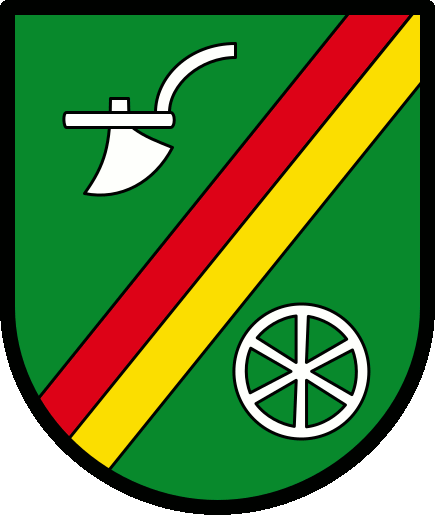
- Coat of arms

- Location of Lorup within Emsland district
- Interactive map of Lorup
- Location within Germany Location within Lower Saxony
- Coordinates: 52°55′31″N 7°38′31″E
- Country: Germany
- State: Lower Saxony
- District: Emsland
- Municipal assoc.: Werlte

Government
  - Mayor: Wilhelm Helmer (CDU)

Area
  - Total: 51.22 km^{2} (19.78 sq mi)
- Elevation: 30 m (98 ft)

Population (2025-12-31)
  - Total: 3,230
  - Density: 63.1/km^{2} (163/sq mi)
- Time zone: UTC+01:00 (CET)
  - Summer (DST): UTC+02:00 (CEST)
- Postal codes: 26901
- Dialling codes: 0 59 54
- Vehicle registration: EL
- Website: www.lorup.de

Lorup is a municipality in the Emsland district, in Lower Saxony, Germany.
