= Wippingen =

- Municipality
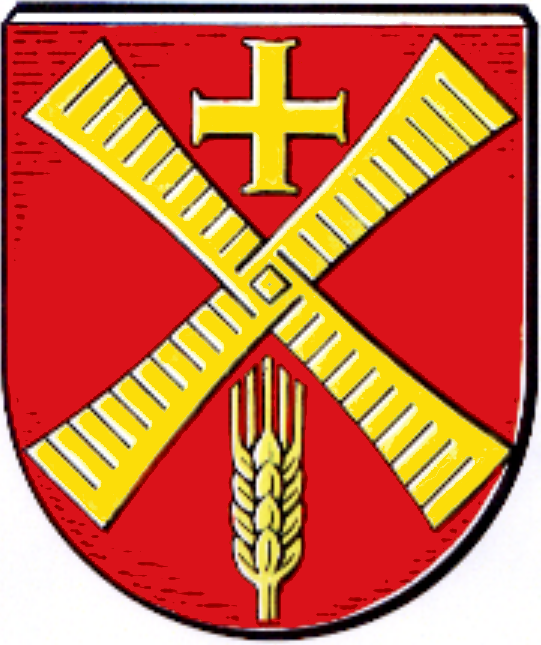
- Coat of arms

- Location of Wippingen within Emsland district
- Interactive map of Wippingen
- Location within Germany Location within Lower Saxony
- Coordinates: 52°55′N 07°25′E
- Country: Germany
- State: Lower Saxony
- District: Emsland
- Municipal assoc.: Dörpen

Government
  - Mayor: Hermann Gerdes (CDU)

Area
  - Total: 16.54 km^{2} (6.39 sq mi)
- Elevation: 14 m (46 ft)

Population (2025-12-31)
  - Total: 996
  - Density: 60.2/km^{2} (156/sq mi)
- Time zone: UTC+01:00 (CET)
  - Summer (DST): UTC+02:00 (CEST)
- Postal codes: 26892
- Dialling codes: 04966
- Vehicle registration: EL
- Website: www.hallo-wippingen.de

Wippingen is a municipality in the Emsland district, in Lower Saxony, Germany.
