= Werlte (Samtgemeinde) =

- Samtgemeinde
- Coat of arms

- Location of Werlte within Emsland district
- Interactive map of Werlte
- Location within Germany Location within Lower Saxony
- Coordinates: 52°51′N 7°40′E
- Country: Germany
- State: Lower Saxony
- District: Emsland

Government
  - Mayor (2021–26): Ludger Kewe (CDU)

Area
  - Total: 200.11 km^{2} (77.26 sq mi)
- Elevation: 32 m (105 ft)

Population (2025-12-31)
  - Total: 17,515
  - Density: 87.527/km^{2} (226.69/sq mi)
- Time zone: UTC+01:00 (CET)
  - Summer (DST): UTC+02:00 (CEST)
- Vehicle registration: EL
- Website: sgwerlte.de

Samtgemeinde Werlte is a Samtgemeinde in the district Emsland in Lower Saxony, Germany.

The Samtgemeinde Werlte consists of the following municipalities:

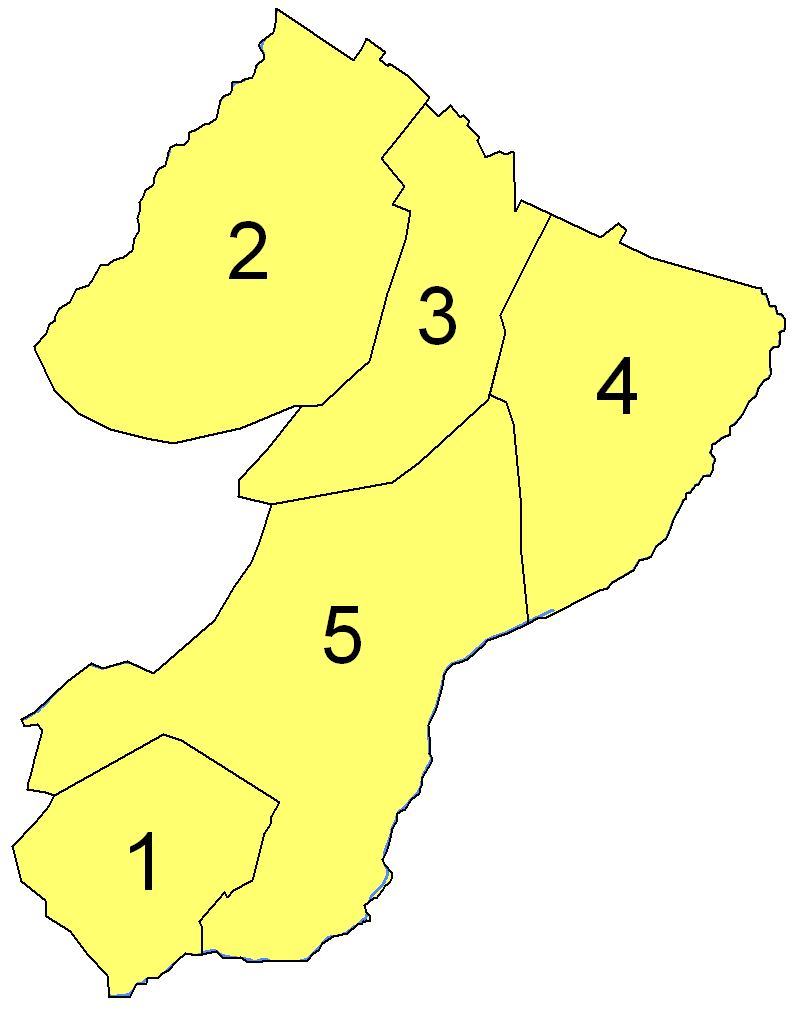

1. Lahn
2. Lorup
3. Rastdorf
4. Vrees
5. Werlte
