= Herzlake =

- Municipality
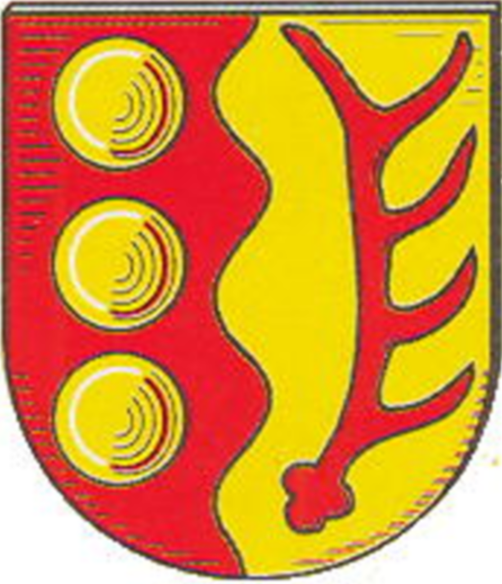
- Coat of arms

- Location of Herzlake within Emsland district
- Interactive map of Herzlake
- Location within Germany Location within Lower Saxony
- Coordinates: 52°42′N 07°35′E
- Country: Germany
- State: Lower Saxony
- District: Emsland
- Municipal assoc.: Herzlake
- Subdivisions: 5 Ortsteile

Government
  - Mayor: Hans Bösken (CDU)

Area
  - Total: 49.77 km^{2} (19.22 sq mi)
- Elevation: 25 m (82 ft)

Population (2025-12-31)
  - Total: 4,837
  - Density: 97.19/km^{2} (251.7/sq mi)
- Time zone: UTC+01:00 (CET)
  - Summer (DST): UTC+02:00 (CEST)
- Postal codes: 49770
- Dialling codes: 05962
- Vehicle registration: EL

Herzlake is a municipality in the Emsland district, in Lower Saxony, Germany.

== Villages are situated in Herzlake ==
- Bookhof
- Felsen
- Herzlake
- Neuenlande
- Westrum
