= Vrees =

- Municipality
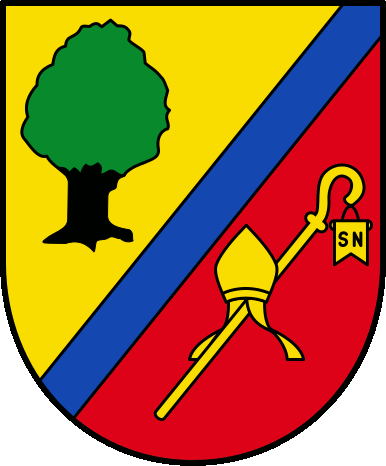
- Coat of arms

- Location of Vrees within Emsland district
- Interactive map of Vrees
- Location within Germany Location within Lower Saxony
- Coordinates: 52°53′7″N 7°46′14″E
- Country: Germany
- State: Lower Saxony
- District: Emsland
- Municipal assoc.: Werlte

Government
  - Mayor: Heribert Kleene (CDU)

Area
  - Total: 37.56 km^{2} (14.50 sq mi)
- Elevation: 33 m (108 ft)

Population (2025-12-31)
  - Total: 1,975
  - Density: 52.58/km^{2} (136.2/sq mi)
- Time zone: UTC+01:00 (CET)
  - Summer (DST): UTC+02:00 (CEST)
- Postal codes: 49757
- Dialling codes: 0 44 79
- Vehicle registration: EL
- Website: www.vrees.de

Vrees is a municipality in the Emsland district, in Lower Saxony, Germany.
