= Exhibition Centre for the Archaeology of the Emsland =

Coordinates: 52°41′16.5″N 7°18′17.5″E

Exhibition Centre for the Archaeology of the Emsland, Meppen

The Exhibition Centre for the Archaeology of the Emsland (German: Ausstellungszentrum für die Archäologie des Emslandes) is an archaeological museum in Meppen in Lower Saxony, Germany. It portrays the cultural history of the region of Emsland from the Stone Age to the Middle Ages. Since 1996 the museum has been housed in a modern construction within a Classicist building complex on the Koppelschleuse.

The permanent exhibition displays the prehistory and protohistory of the Emsland with archaeological finds, models and illustrations. The most important research findings of New Stone Age house building, Bronze Age and Iron Age material culture and burial customs to the settlements of the Roman Empire period are presented. Museum education options for children and schools and changing special exhibitions enhance what the centre has to offer.

== Literature ==
- Andrea Kaltofen (1991), Landkreis Emsland. Schulverwaltungs- und Kulturamt (ed.), Versunkene Dörfer: zum Kenntnisstand des ur- und frühgeschichtlichen dörflichen Lebens im Emsland – Ausstellung des Landkreises Emsland in Meppen vom 15. Februar bis 7. April 1991. (in German), Meppen, ISBN 3-927099-24-4
