= Dersum =

- Municipality
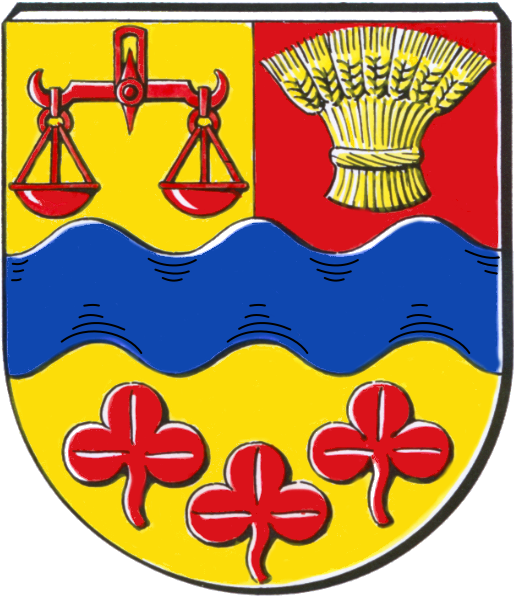
- Flag Coat of arms

- Location of Dersum within Emsland district
- Interactive map of Dersum
- Location within Germany Location within Lower Saxony
- Coordinates: 52°57′37″N 07°16′32″E
- Country: Germany
- State: Lower Saxony
- District: Emsland
- Municipal assoc.: Dörpen

Government
  - Mayor: Paul Hannen (CDU)

Area
  - Total: 28.57 km^{2} (11.03 sq mi)
- Elevation: 7 m (23 ft)

Population (2025-12-31)
  - Total: 1,457
  - Density: 51.00/km^{2} (132.1/sq mi)
- Time zone: UTC+01:00 (CET)
  - Summer (DST): UTC+02:00 (CEST)
- Postal codes: 26906
- Dialling codes: 04963
- Vehicle registration: EL
- Website: www.dersum.de

Dersum is a municipality in the Emsland district, in Lower Saxony, Germany. It lies between the River Ems in the east and the border with the Netherlands in the west. Haren is about 24 kilometers to the south and Papenburg about 17 kilometres to the north east.
