= Rastdorf =

- Municipality
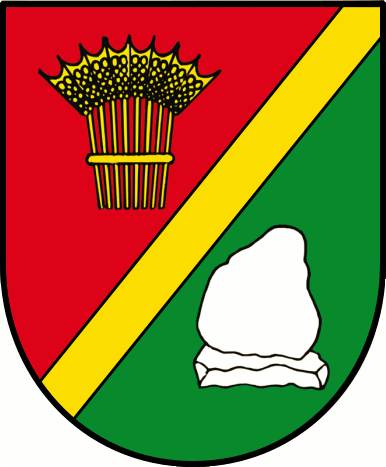
- Coat of arms

- Location of Rastdorf within Emsland district
- Interactive map of Rastdorf
- Location within Germany Location within Lower Saxony
- Coordinates: 52°54′N 07°42′E
- Country: Germany
- State: Lower Saxony
- District: Emsland
- Municipal assoc.: Werlte

Government
  - Mayor: Hartmut Moorkamp (CDU)

Area
  - Total: 26.33 km^{2} (10.17 sq mi)
- Elevation: 30 m (98 ft)

Population (2025-12-31)
  - Total: 1,079
  - Density: 40.98/km^{2} (106.1/sq mi)
- Time zone: UTC+01:00 (CET)
  - Summer (DST): UTC+02:00 (CEST)
- Postal codes: 26901
- Dialling codes: 0 59 56
- Vehicle registration: EL
- Website: www.rastdorf.de

Rastdorf is a municipality in the Emsland district, in Lower Saxony, Germany.
