= Kluse =

- Municipality
- Location of Kluse within Emsland district
- Interactive map of Kluse
- Location within Germany Location within Lower Saxony
- Coordinates: 52°55′N 07°19′E
- Country: Germany
- State: Lower Saxony
- District: Emsland
- Municipal assoc.: Dörpen

Government
  - Mayor: Hermann Borchers (CDU)

Area
  - Total: 25.26 km^{2} (9.75 sq mi)
- Elevation: 10 m (33 ft)

Population (2025-12-31)
  - Total: 1,779
  - Density: 70.43/km^{2} (182.4/sq mi)
- Time zone: UTC+01:00 (CET)
  - Summer (DST): UTC+02:00 (CEST)
- Postal codes: 26892
- Dialling codes: 04963, 04966, 05933
- Vehicle registration: EL

Kluse is a municipality in the Emsland district, in Lower Saxony, Germany.

== People ==
- Emmy von Dincklage (1825-1891), de:Emmy von Dincklage, German writer
- Clara von Dincklage-Campe (1829-1919), de:Clara von Dincklage-Campe, German writer
- Friedrich von Dincklage-Campe (1839-1918), de:Friedrich von Dincklage-Campe, German soldier and writer
