= Heede, Lower Saxony =

Heede
- Municipality
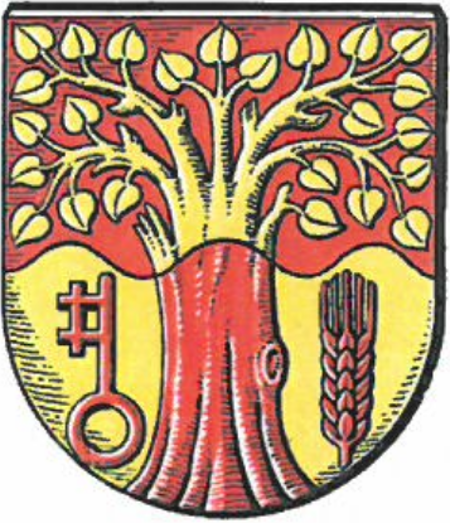
- Coat of arms

- Location of Heede within Emsland district
- Interactive map of Heede
- Location within Germany Location within Lower Saxony
- Coordinates: 52°59′32″N 7°18′15″E
- Country: Germany
- State: Lower Saxony
- District: Emsland
- Municipal assoc.: Dörpen

Government
  - Mayor: Antonius Pohlmann (CDU)

Area
  - Total: 31.11 km^{2} (12.01 sq mi)
- Elevation: 4 m (13 ft)

Population (2025-12-31)
  - Total: 2,506
  - Density: 80.55/km^{2} (208.6/sq mi)
- Time zone: UTC+01:00 (CET)
  - Summer (DST): UTC+02:00 (CEST)
- Postal codes: 26892
- Dialling codes: 04963
- Vehicle registration: EL
- Website: www.heede-ems.de

Heede (German pronunciation: [ˈheːdə]) is a municipality in the Emsland district, in Lower Saxony, Germany.
