= Dörpen =

- Municipality
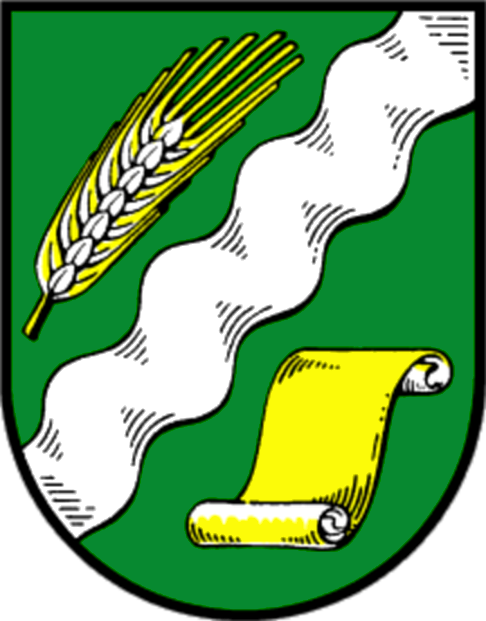
- Flag Coat of arms

- Location of Dörpen within Emsland district
- Interactive map of Dörpen
- Location within Germany Location within Lower Saxony
- Coordinates: 52°58′00″N 07°20′12″E
- Country: Germany
- State: Lower Saxony
- District: Emsland
- Municipal assoc.: Dörpen

Government
  - Mayor: Manfred Gerdes (CDU)

Area
  - Total: 33.06 km^{2} (12.76 sq mi)
- Elevation: 16 m (52 ft)

Population (2025-12-31)
  - Total: 5,501
  - Density: 166.4/km^{2} (431.0/sq mi)
- Time zone: UTC+01:00 (CET)
  - Summer (DST): UTC+02:00 (CEST)
- Postal codes: 26892
- Dialling codes: 04963
- Vehicle registration: EL
- Website: www.doerpen.de

Dörpen is a municipality in the Emsland district, in Lower Saxony, Germany. Dörpen is the seat of the Samtgemeinde Dörpen.
