= Lehe, Lower Saxony =

Lehe
- Municipality
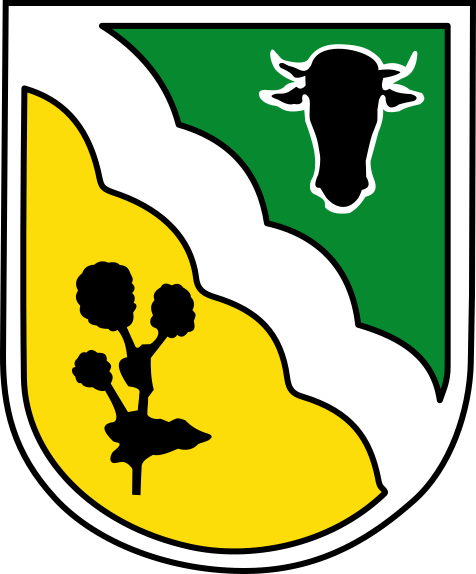
- Coat of arms

- Location of Lehe within Emsland district
- Interactive map of Lehe
- Location within Germany Location within Lower Saxony
- Coordinates: 53°00′12″N 07°19′49″E
- Country: Germany
- State: Lower Saxony
- District: Emsland
- Municipal assoc.: Dörpen

Government
  - Mayor: Johann Mardink (CDU)

Area
  - Total: 17.87 km^{2} (6.90 sq mi)
- Elevation: 6 m (20 ft)

Population (2025-12-31)
  - Total: 991
  - Density: 55.5/km^{2} (144/sq mi)
- Time zone: UTC+01:00 (CET)
  - Summer (DST): UTC+02:00 (CEST)
- Postal codes: 26892
- Dialling codes: 04962
- Vehicle registration: EL
- Website: www.lehe-ems.de

Lehe (German pronunciation: [ˈleːə]) is a municipality in the Emsland district, in Lower Saxony, Germany.

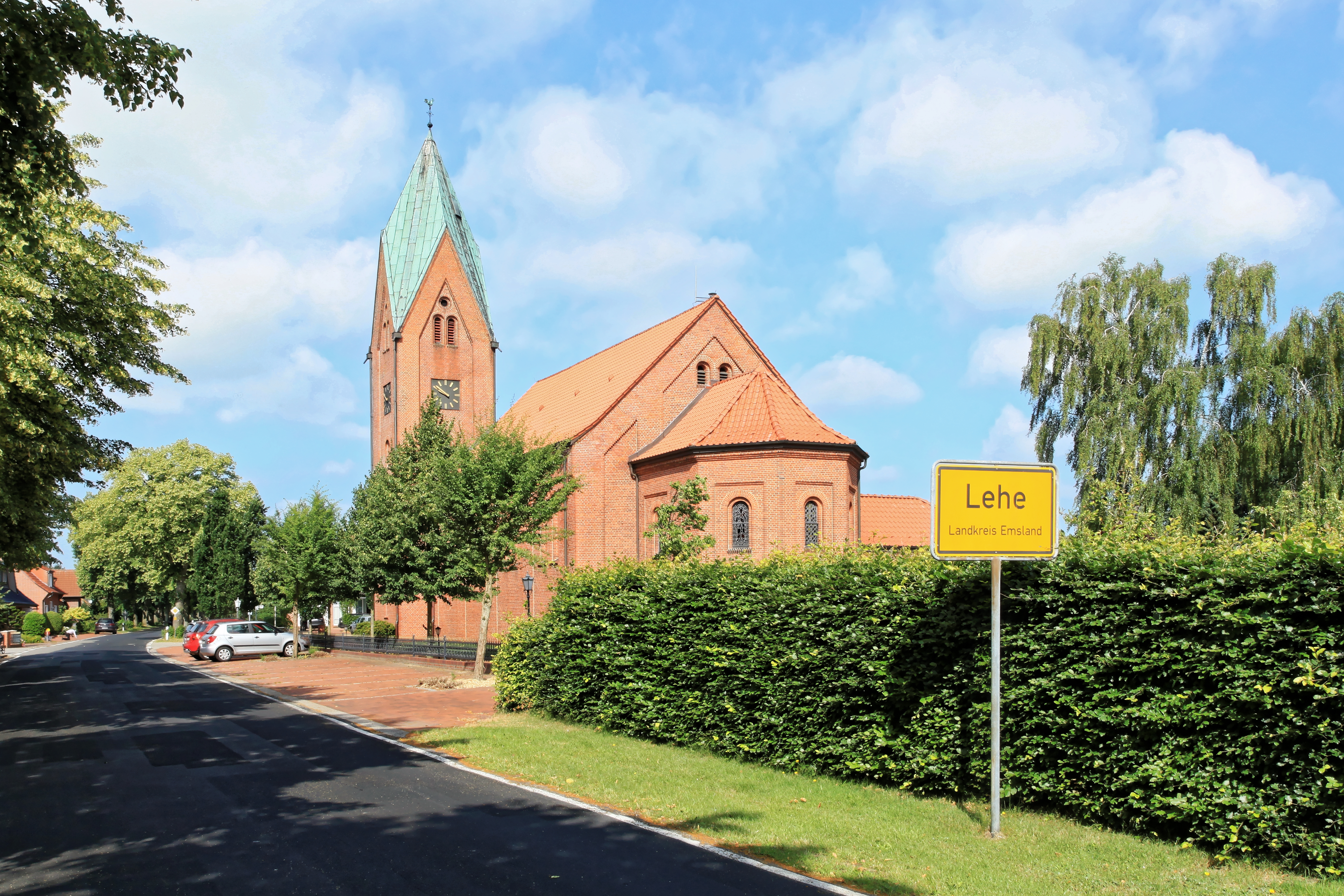
Lehe, church
