= Lahn, Lower Saxony =

Lahn
- Municipality
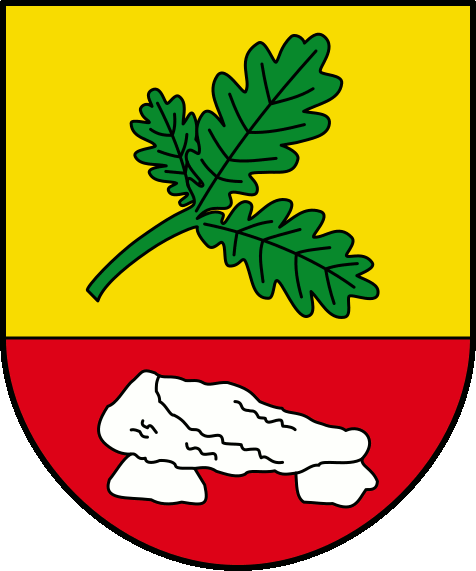
- Coat of arms

- Location of Lahn within Emsland district
- Interactive map of Lahn
- Location within Germany Location within Lower Saxony
- Coordinates: 52°49′N 07°37′E
- Country: Germany
- State: Lower Saxony
- District: Emsland
- Municipal assoc.: Werlte

Government
  - Mayor: Bernhard Winkler (CDU)

Area
  - Total: 21.24 km^{2} (8.20 sq mi)
- Elevation: 30 m (98 ft)

Population (2025-12-31)
  - Total: 912
  - Density: 42.9/km^{2} (111/sq mi)
- Time zone: UTC+01:00 (CET)
  - Summer (DST): UTC+02:00 (CEST)
- Postal codes: 49757
- Dialling codes: 0 59 51
- Vehicle registration: EL
- Website: www.lahn-emsland.de

Lahn (German pronunciation: [laːn]) is a municipality in the Emsland district, in Lower Saxony, Germany.
