= Geeste, Emsland =

Geeste
- Municipality
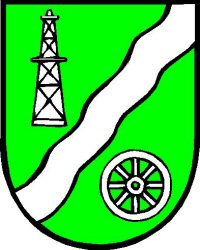
- Flag Coat of arms

- Location of Geeste within Emsland district
- Interactive map of Geeste
- Location within Germany Location within Lower Saxony
- Coordinates: 52°36′N 07°16′E
- Country: Germany
- State: Lower Saxony
- District: Emsland
- Subdivisions: 7 Ortsteile

Government
  - Mayor (2021–26): Helmut Höke (CDU)

Area
  - Total: 133.07 km^{2} (51.38 sq mi)
- Elevation: 23 m (75 ft)

Population (2025-12-31)
  - Total: 12,186
  - Density: 91.576/km^{2} (237.18/sq mi)
- Time zone: UTC+01:00 (CET)
  - Summer (DST): UTC+02:00 (CEST)
- Postal codes: 49744
- Dialling codes: 05937, 05907, 05963
- Vehicle registration: EL
- Website: www.geeste.de

Geeste is a municipality in the district Emsland in Lower Saxony.

Situation of the local parts in the municipality of Geeste:

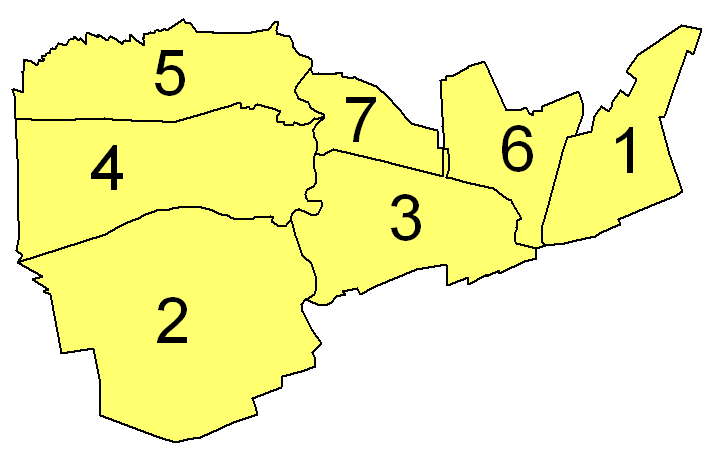

1. Bramhar
2. Dalum L
3. Geeste
4. Groß Hesepe
5. Klein Hesepe
6. Osterbrock W
7. Varloh

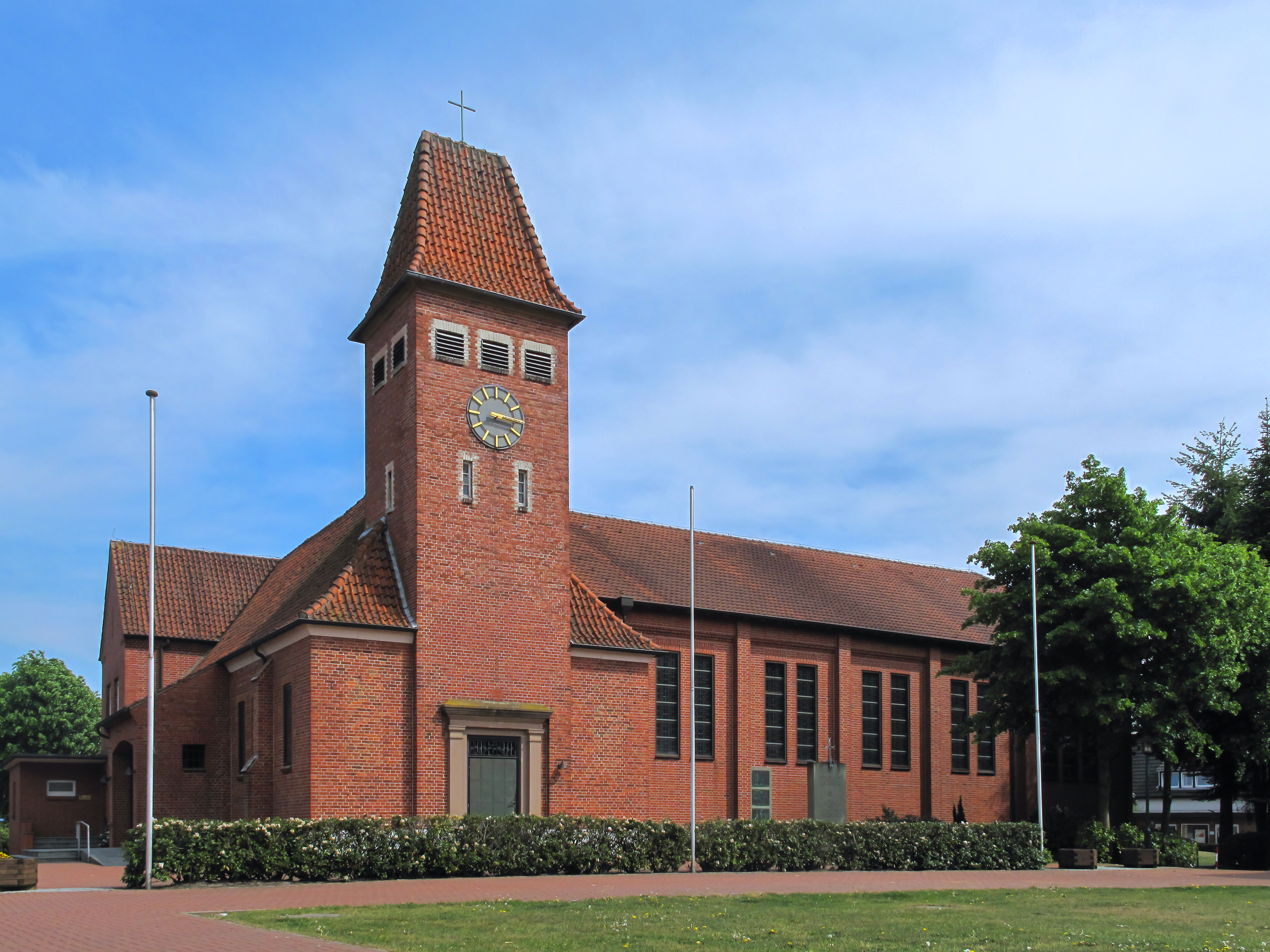
Osterbrock, church: Sankt Isidorkirche
