= Route of Megalithic Culture =

Tourist route in North-West Germany

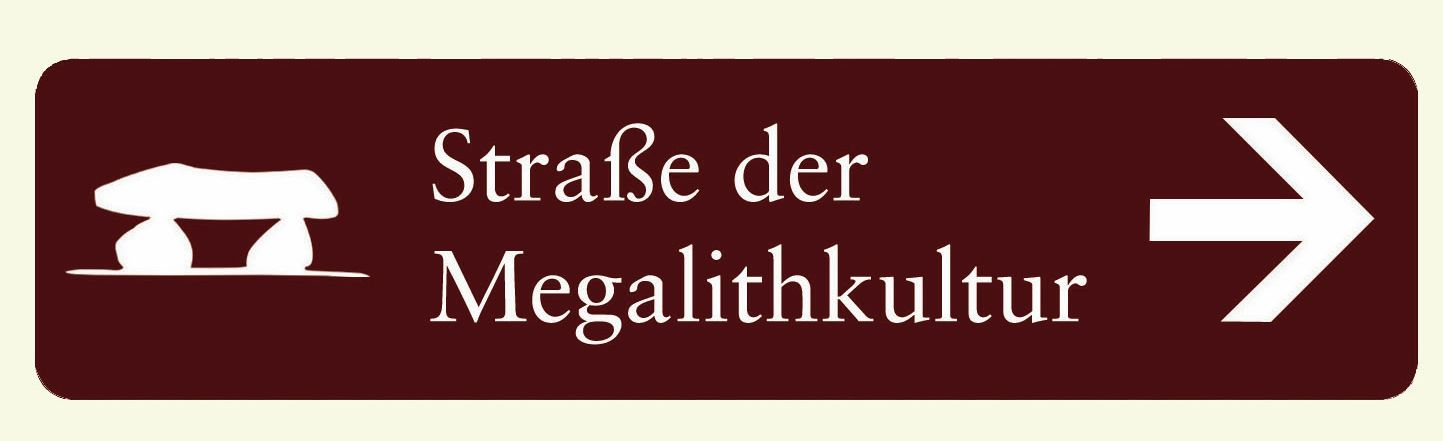
Standard design of road signs

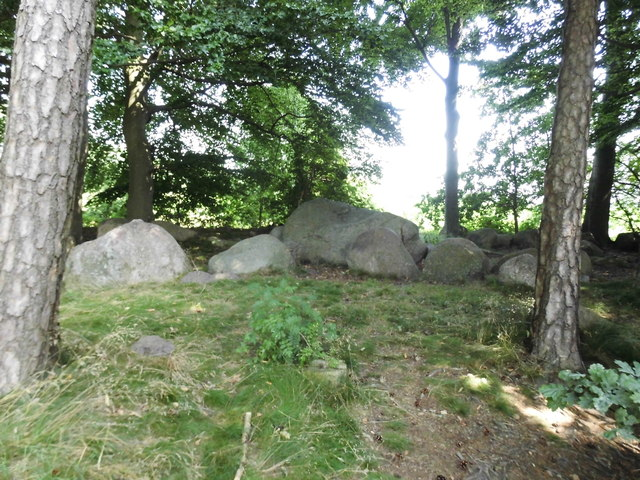
One of the Megalithic sites near Steinkimmen, this chambered grave is known locally as 'Hünensteine', a not uncommon name for megalithic sites, although usually Menhirs. Station 32 on the route

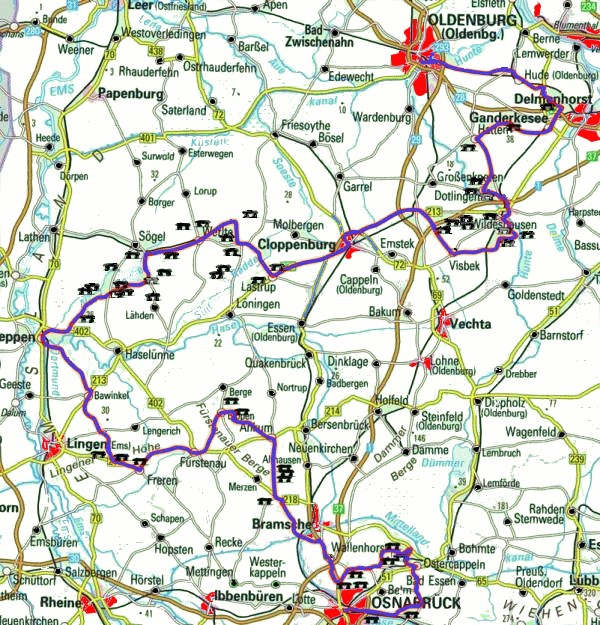
Map of the route

The Route of Megalithic Culture (German: Straße der Megalithkultur) was first created as a tourist route that meanders from Osnabrück to Oldenburg in North-West Germany. Signposted with brown road signs it links many places of archaeological interest from the Megalithic era.

Signs for the route started going up in 2008 and 2009. The whole 310-kilometre-long route was officially opened on 14 May 2009.

The route links many sites of archaeological investigation and 33 stations where the public can visit archaeological sites, for example, with standing stones.

On the 27th of August 2013, the route became part of the Cultural Route of the Council of Europe initiative, with sections in a growing number of countries, including Denmark, England, Netherlands, Portugal, and Sweden.

== Route ==
The founding section of the Route of Megalithic Culture runs through the territories of Osnabrück, Ostercappeln, Belm-Vehrte, Wallenhorst, Bramsche, Ankum, Berge, Bippen, Fürstenau, Freren, Thuine, Lingen (Ems), Meppen, Sögel, Werlte, Lastrup, Cloppenburg, Visbek, Großenkneten, Wildeshausen, Dötlingen, Ganderkesee and Oldenburg.

It is planned to extend the route, on the one side towards North Rhine-Westphalia, and on the other towards northeast Lower Saxony as far as Schleswig-Holstein. The original route in Lower Saxony now forms part of a greater EU initiative with similar routes in Denmark, England, Netherlands, Portugal, and Sweden. In the Netherlands, for instance, there are another 53 megalithic sites.

== Purpose ==
The Route of Megalithic Culture is intended to give a better understanding of the lives of people who lived over 5,000 years ago in all its member countries. The founding part of the route in northwest Germany has 33 stations, with insights into the function and design of their graves, their conception of the afterlife, understanding of nature and everyday lives. In some cases, the holiday road also leads to groups of Bronze Age and Iron Age tumuli of more recent times.

The flyer for the Route of Megalithic Culture not only shows the numerous stone age stations of megalithic culture, but also other sights and points of interest along the way. These include sights especially around the town of Osnabrück with its Cultural History Museum, the castles and palaces in Osnabrück Land, the Venne Iron Age House, the Old St Alexander's Church, the Kalkriese Museum and Park, the Cloth Maker's Museum, Bramsche, Malgarten Abbey, Börstel Abbey, the town of Meppen, the Hüven Mill, Clemenswerth Palace, the Cloppenburg Museum Village, St. Alexander's Church, the village of Dötlingen, Hude Abbey and the city of Oldenburg with its State Museum of Nature and People.

== Stations ==
The 33 stations as numbered on the official web site.

Station	Name	Picture	Location	Sprockhoff No.	Comments
1 a	Teufelssteine	Teufelssteine	Voxtrup (Osnabrück)	914	
1 b	Gretescher Steine	Gretescher Steine	Gretesch (Osnabrück)	920	
2	Großsteingrab Jeggen	Großsteingrab Jeggen	Jeggen (Bissendorf)	922	
3 a	Driehauser Steine	Driehauser Steine	Darpvenne (Ostercappeln)	903	
3 b-d	Darpvenner Steine I-III	Darpvenner Steine I Darpvenner Steine II Darpvenner Steine III	Darpvenne (Ostercappeln)	900–902	
4 a–c	Süntelstein; Großsteingräber bei Vehrte	Süntelstein Teufels Teigtrog Teufels Backofen	Vehrte (Belm)	915–916	Devil's Oven (Teufels Backofen)
5	Helmichsteine	Helmichsteine	Rulle (Wallenhorst)	908	also known as Gevasteine
6 a–b	Östringer Steine	Oestringer Steine I Oestringer Steine II	Nettetal (Osnabrück)	912–913	In Östringen is another grave site (Östringer Steine III), which is not part of the Route's inventory
7 a–b	Karlsteine	Große Karlsteine Kleine Karlsteine	Haste (Osnabrück)	909–910	
8	Wiemelsberger Steine	Wiemelsberger Steine	Ueffeln (Bramsche)	897	
9 a–f	Großsteingräberweg Giersfeld	Reinecke Meyer Grumfeld West Rickelmann I	Westerholte (Ankum)	891–896	
10 a	Großsteingrab Restrup und Näpfchenstein „Teufelsstein“	Näpfchenstein	Restrup (Bippen)	886	
10 b	Hekeser Steine	Hekese, Grab B	Hekese (Berge)	883–884	In Hekese are two megalithic tombs, which are associated with a stone row.
11	Großsteingrab im Alt-Frerener Forst	Großsteingrab im Alt-Frerener Forst	Freren	875	
12 a	Großsteingrab in der Kunkenvenne	Großsteingrab in der Kunkenvenne	Thuine	874	
12 b	Großsteingrab auf dem Radberg		873		
13	Der Steinerne Schlüssel	Der steinerne Schlüssel	Apeldorn (Meppen)	852	The Exhibition Centre for the Archaeology of the Emsland is in Meppen.
14 a–d	Großsteingräber Deymanns Mühle I-IV	Großsteingrab Deymanns Mühle I Großsteingrab Deymanns Mühle II Großsteingrab Deymanns Mühle III Großsteingrab Deymanns Mühle IV	Stavern (Sögel)	848–851	
14 e	Großsteingrab am Osteresch	Großsteingrab am Osteresch	Stavern (Sögel)	847	
14 f	Großsteingrab Groß-Stavern 1	Bruneforths Esch in Stavern	Stavern (Sögel)	846	The grave Groß-Stavern 1 is also known as Bruneforths Esch.
15 a	Großsteingrab bei den Düvelskuhlen	Großsteingrab bei den Düvelskuhlen	Sögel	831	
15 b	Hünenbett bei den Düvelskuhlen		Sögel	832	
15 c	Großsteingrab Püttkesberge	Großsteingrab Püttkesberge	Sögel	833	
16 a–e	Hünengräberstraße des Hümmling	Großsteingrab Im Ipeken Großsteingrab Groß Berßen IV Großsteingrab Groß Berßen VI (Wappengrab) Großsteingrab Groß Berßen VIII (Königsgrab) Großsteingrab Groß Berßen VII reconstructed	Groß Berßen	856–861	
17 a	Volbers Hünensteine	Volberts Hünensteine	Hüven	842	
17 b	Großsteingrab Hüven-Süd	Großsteingrab Hüven-Süd	Hüven	843	
17 c	Großsteingrab Lähden I	Großsteingrab Lähden I	Lähden	866	
18 a	Steenhus in den Klöbertannen		Werpeloh	822	Originally, station no. 18 a had been the Großsteingrab am Kölkesberg (Spr.-No. 838).
18 b	Großsteingrab in den Klöbertannen	Großsteingrab Werpeloh II	Werpeloh	823	Originally, station no. 18 b had been the Großsteingrab an der Kölkesdose (Spr.-No. 837).
18 c	Großsteingräber auf der Buschhöhe	Großsteingrab Werpeloh IV	Werpeloh	825-826	
18 d	Steenhus von Börger	Steenhus von Börger	Börger	819	
19	Ganggrab von Ostenwalde	Ganggrab von Ostenwalde	Ostenwalde	835	70 Meter from the original location. In Ostenwalde are two more Megalithic tombs which are not part of the Route's inventory.
20 a	De hoogen Stener	De hoogen Steener in Werlte	Werlte	830	
20 b	Poldenhünensteine	Poldenhünensteine in Harrenstätte	Spahnharrenstätte	829	
21	Teufelssteine (Molbergen)	Teufelssteine	Peheim (Molbergen)	959	
22 a	Schlingsteine	Schlingsteine	Lindern-Neuenkämpen	961	
22 b	Großsteingrab Hünensteine	Hünensteine	Lindern-Herrensand	962	
22 c	Großsteingrab am hohen Stein und der hohe Stein	Garen, am hohen Stein Garen, der hohe Stein	Lindern-Garen	963–964	The Giant's Tomb and High Stone are also known as Garen megalithic tomb.
23	Oldendorfer Hünensteine	Oldendorfer Hünensteine	Oldendorf (Lastrup)	968	
24 a	Visbeker Bräutigam	Visbeker Bräutigam 934 Visbeker Bräutigam 935 Visbeker Bräutigam 936 Visbeker Bräutigam 937 Visbeker Bräutigam 938 (Brautwagen)	Großenkneten	934–938, 939–940	
24 b	Heidenopfertisch	Heidenopfertisch	Engelmannsbäke (Visbek)	974	
24 c–d	Ahlhorner Kellersteine	Ahlhorner Kellersteine I Ahlhorner Kellersteine II	Ahlhorn (Großenkneten)	939–940	
25 a–c	Kleinenknetener Steine	Kleinenkneten I Kleinenkneten II Kleinenkneten III	Kleinenkneten (Wildeshausen)	957–958, 947	The third grave (station 25 c) was originally in Dotlingen and was moved in the 1930s to Kleinenkneten.
26	Pestruper Gräberfeld	Pestruper Gräberfeld	Pestrup (Wildeshausen)	–	Also known as Grabhügelfeld (Grave mound field).
27 a	Hohe Steine	Hohe Steine	Wildeshausen	956	
27 b	Bargloyer Steinkiste	Bargloyer Steinkste	Bargloy (Wildeshausen)	–	This monument has no Sprockhoff No.
28 a	Visbeker Braut	Visbeker Braut	Aumühle (Wildeshausen)	952	
28 b	Große Steine bei Thölstedt	Große Steine bei Thölstedt	Thölstedt	953	
29 a–b	Reckumer Steine	Großsteingrab Reckum I Großsteingrab Reckum II	Winkelsett (Harpstedt)	811–812	
30 a	Gerichtsstätte	Großsteingrab Gerichtsstätte	Dötlingen	945	
30 b–d	Glaner Braut	Glaner Braut I Glaner Braut II Glaner Braut III Glaner Braut IV	Glane (Wildeshausen)	948–951	
30 e	Großsteingrab am Schießstand (Dötlinger Steingrab)	Großsteingrab am Schießstand (Dötlinger Steingrab)	Dötlingen	944	
31	Großsteingrab Steenberg	Großsteingrab Steenberg	Kirchhatten	926	Also called „Hatten 2“; more than 30% of stones seem to be in the original position.
32 a–b	Hünensteine von Steinkimmen	Hünensteine I Hünensteine II	Steinkimmen (Gemeinde Ganderkesee)	927–928	Nearby there is a third grave (Steinkimmen Hünensteine III, Sprockhoff no. 929) that is not part of the route inventory.
33	Große Steine von Stenum	Große Steine von Stenum	Stenum (Ganderkesee)	930	

== Organisation and financing ==
The Straße der Megalithkultur is a community project resulting from collaboration between:

- Emsland Touristik GmbH
- Landkreis Vechta
- Museum am Schölerberg Osnabrück - Natur und Umwelt, Planetarium
- Niedersächsisches Landesamt für Denkmalpflege
- Oldenburg Tourismus und Marketing GmbH
- Stadt- und Kreisarchäologie Osnabrück
- Tourismusverband Osnabrücker Land e.V.
- Zweckverband Erholungsgebiet Thülsfelder Talsperre
- Zweckverband Naturpark Wildeshauser Geest

Authorised by the Behörde für Geoinformation, Landentwicklung und Liegenschaften (Department of Geoinformation, Land Usage and Property), financing for the Route of Megalithic Culture is provided from EU funds, distributed to local tourism and district authorities.

In May 2011, at the request of the tourism office for Osnabrück county (Landkreis) the tourism promotion department of the Ministry for Economic Affairs provided a subsidy of €180,600 for the route.
