= Hümmling =

Highest point
- Peak: Windberg
- Elevation: 73

Dimensions
- Length: 40 km (25 mi)
- Width: 14 km (8.7 mi)

Geography
- Location: Lower Saxony
- Range coordinates: 52°55′N 7°32′E

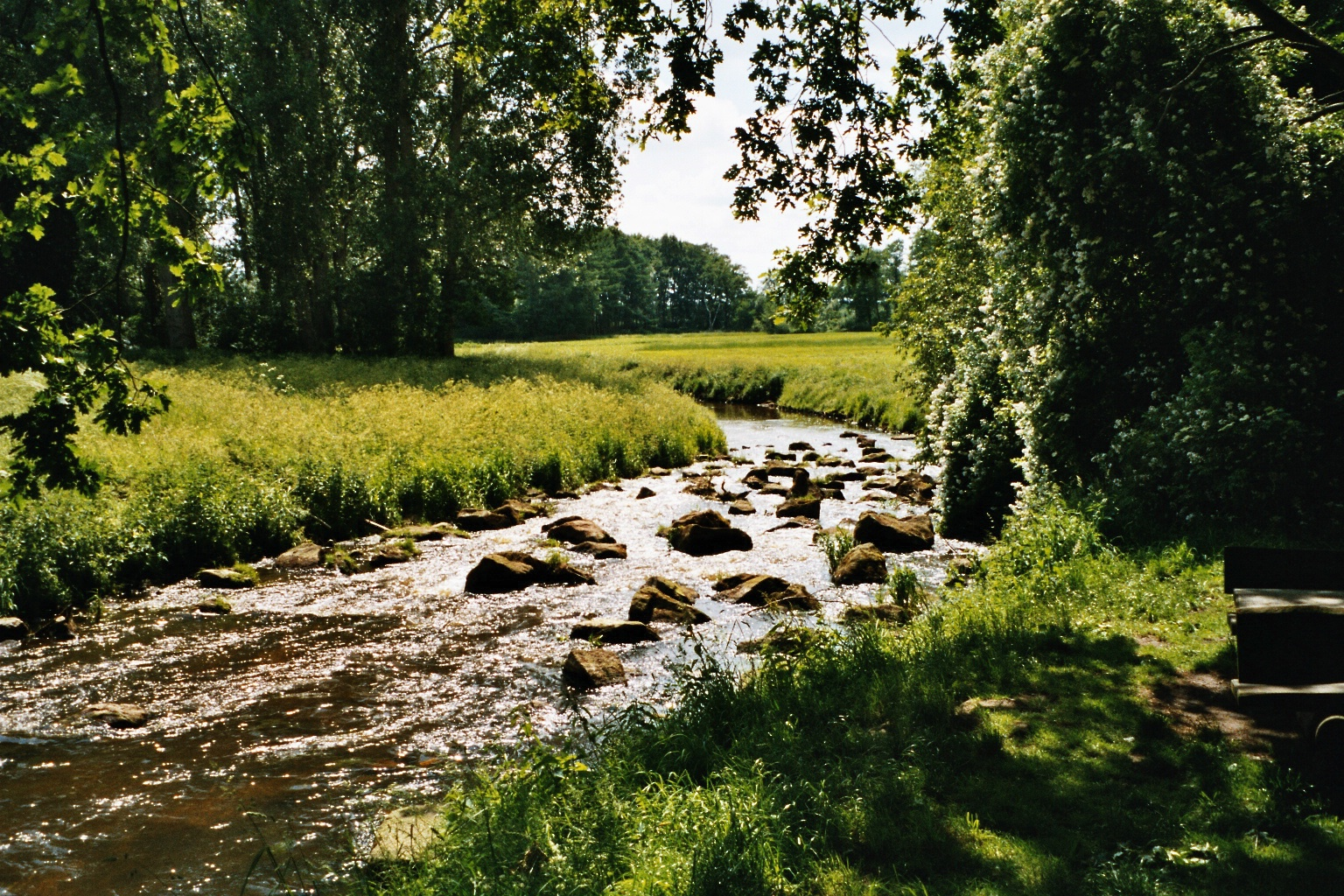
The Mittelradde, one of the rivers in the Hümmling

The Hümmling (Homelinghen, from hömil = small stone) is a ground moraine landscape, up to 73 m above sea level (NN), in the Emsland region on the North German Plain in the western part of the German state of Lower Saxony.

== Location ==
The wooded Hümmling, which is about 28 km long and only a few kilometres wide, is situated in the northern part of the region of Emsland and the district of the same name, and the drainage area of Ems river. It is limited by the Ems valley in the west and the Saterland in the east. It is located around the town of Werlte which is about 22 km northeast of Meppen. Various streams rise in the Hümmling which discharge into the Hase to the south, the Ems to the southeast and the Leda to the north.

== History ==
There are over 100 more or less well-preserved dolmens of the megalith culture in the Hümmling hills. In times of the Holy Roman Empire, Hümmling region was the northern part of the Prince-Bishopric of Münster, called the Niederstift Münster (i. e. analogously "Lower Prince-Bishopric of Münster"), whereas in ecclesiastical respect the area was part of the Diocese of Osnabrück. In those days, Emsland was a part of the region of Westphalia. Clemens August, prince-bishop of Münster ordered to build Clemenswerth Castle to be built as a summer residence for his hunting holidays. It became a main example of Westphalian Baroque. When ge tried to use their soccage in order to build that castle, the peasants of the "Free Hümmling" fought a log successful trial at the Imperial Chamber Court in Wetzlar that they were not enfeoffed to anyone.

After short periods under the rule of the Duchy of Arenberg (1803 to 1810) and then the French Empire (1810 to 1814), Hümmling hills as a part of northern Emsland region became the west of the Kingdom of Hanover (1814 to 1866). After the annexion of that state by the kingdom of Prussia it belonged to the Province of Hanover.

== Culture ==
A typical Hümmling speciality is the Baukweiten Janhinnerk, a pancake made of buckwheat flour with syrup, apple sauce, cranberries, egg, cheese, bread or rye bread.

The 'national anthem' of the Hümmlings is the Hümmelske Bur, a song, which typecasts the characteristics of the local population.

There is still a local dialect, the Hümmlinger Platt, which belongs to the Northern Low Saxon group of West Low German dialects. Not until about 1975 were generations born that grew up speaking High German.

The Hüven Mill is a technological attraction in the Hümmling. It is the last fully preserved combined wind- and watermill in Europe.

=== Religion ===
The Hümmling is 93% Roman Catholic. After the Second World War there was a large number of refugees from the old eastern provinces of Germany and, since 1990 there have also been ethnic German immigrants from the former Soviet Union in the Hümmling who, in addition to the Catholic faith, also belong to the New Apostolic Church and other Protestant faiths (Pentecostals, Baptists).

== Elevations ==
The elevations and land cells in the Hümmling hill country and its near vicinity include (heights in metres above sea level (NN)):

- Windberg (73 m) – east of Werpeloh
- Lüttker Sand (72 m) – northeast of Werpeloh
- Sunderberg (66 m) – south of Börger
- Kreuzberg (51 m) – north of Stavern
- Windelberg (49 m) – northwest of Börger
- Hohenklinken (43 m) – west of Werpeloh
- Buschhöhe (42 m; or Helkensberg) – north of Lorup
- Harrenstätter Sand (42 m) – between Lorup and Spahnharrenstätte
- Wohldhöhe (41 m) – west of Sögel
- Galenberg (40 m) – in Stavern
- Hamberg (ca. 40 m) – between Lathen and Sögel
- Kavenberg (ca. 40 m) – southwest of Lorup
- Großer Westerberg (39 m) – west-northwest of Sögel
- Große Düne (34 m) – between Lathen and Sögel
- Wattberg (34 m) – Surwold in the village of Börgerwald
- Schlopenberg (ca. 30 m) – north-northwest of Börger
- Große Düne (30 m) – between Meppen and Stavern

== Rivers and streams ==
The rivers and streams that rise in and near the hill country of the Hümmling, include the:

- Loruper Beeke, rises in the Hümmling, southeast tributary of the Ohe
- Marka, rises in the Hümmling, east of Werlte, right headstream of the Sagter Ems, which discharges into the Leda
- Mittelradde, rises on the eastern edge of the Hümmling and passes it to the southeast, northern tributary of the Hase
- Nordradde, rises in the middle of the Hümmling, near the Theikenmeer, northeastern tributary of the Ems
- Ohe, rises in the centre of the Hümmling, leaves it in a northern direction, left headstream of the Sagter Ems
- Sagter Ems, results from the confluence of Marka and Ohe north of Friesoythe-Neuscharrel
- Südradde, rises east of the Hümmling, northern tributary of the Hase

== Settlements ==
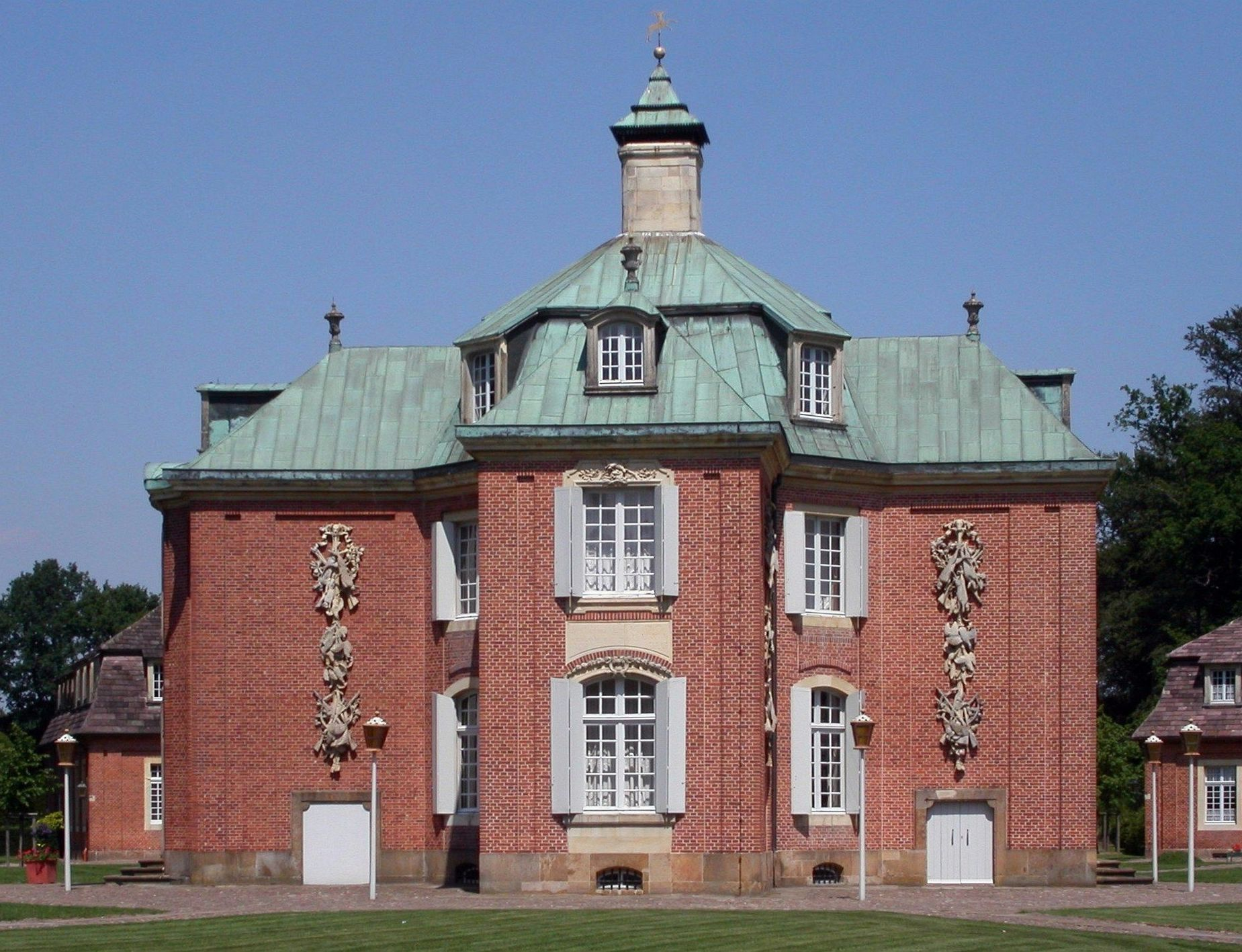
Clemenswerth House in the Emsland

The settlements in and around the Hümmling include:

- Börger
- Breddenberg
- Esterwegen
- Lorup
- Neubörger
- Rastdorf
- Sögel (centre)
- Spahnharrenstätte
- Stavern, Germany (southern edge)
- Surwold (northern edge)
- Werpeloh (centre)
- Werlte

== Sources ==
- Matthias Bähr, Widerstand vor dem Reichskammergericht: Als die "freien Hümmlinger" nach Wetzlar zogen (1739–1768), in: Emsländische Geschichte Bd. 15. Hrsg. von der Studiengesellschaft für Emsländische Regionalgeschichte, Haselünne 2008, ISBN 3-9808021-6-7, S. 468-577
- Wilhelm Ludwig Heermann: Unser Hümmling, unsere Heimat. Gedichte und Erzählungen aus alten Zeiten. Goldschmidt, Werlte 2002, ISBN 3-927099-79-1
- Werner Franke et al.: Der Hümmling mit Sögel, Werlte und Nordhümmling. Reihe Landschaften im Emsland. Emsländischer Heimatbund, Sögel 1995, ISBN 3-88077-077-8
- Autorenkollektiv: Der Hümmling. Ein Heimatbuch. Herausgegeben vom Katholischen Kreislehrerverein des Kreises Hümmling. (Fotomechanischer Nachdruck der Ausgabe von 1929.) Goldschmidt, Werlte 1979
- Holger Lemmermann: Auf dem freien Hümmling. Ländliches Leben in vier Jahrhunderten (1530-1870). 2. Auflage. Emsländischer Heimatbund, Sögel 1995, ISBN 3-88077-126-X
- Lothar Riedel: Die Hümmlinger Kreisbahn. Die Verkehrsgeschichte der schmalspurigen Kleinbahn Lathen-Sögel-Werlte. Röhr, Krefeld 1983, ISBN 3-88490-138-9
