= Unterems (electoral district) =

Federal electoral district of Germany

Coordinates: 53°02′24″N 7°25′40″E

25 Unterems
- Electoral district for the Bundestag
- Unterems in 2025
- State: Lower Saxony
- Population: 321,300 (2019)
- Electorate: 238,506 (2021)
- Major settlements: Papenburg; Leer; Haren
- Area: 2,597.8 km^{2}

Current electoral district
- Created: 1980
- Party: CDU
- Member: Gitta Connemann
- Elected: 2002, 2005, 2009, 2013, 2017, 2021, 2025

Unterems is an electoral constituency (German: Wahlkreis) represented in the Bundestag. It elects one member via first-past-the-post voting. Under the current constituency numbering system, it is designated as constituency 25. It is located in northwestern Lower Saxony, comprising the district of Leer and the northern part of the district of Emsland.

Unterems was created for the 1980 federal election. Since 2002, it has been represented by Gitta Connemann of the Christian Democratic Union (CDU).

== Geography ==
Unterems is located in northwestern Lower Saxony. As of the 2021 federal election, it comprises the entirety of the district of Leer and the northern part of the district of Emsland, specifically the municipalities of Haren, Papenburg, Rhede, and Twist and the Samtgemeinden of Dörpen, Lathen, Nordhümmling, Sögel, and Werlte.

== History ==
Unterems was created in 1980 and contained parts of the abolished constituencies of Emden – Leer and Emsland. Originally, it was constituency 20 in the number system. From the 2002 through 2009 elections, it was constituency 26. Since the 2013 election, it has been constituency 25. Its borders have not changed since its creation.

== Members ==
The constituency has been held by the Christian Democratic Union (CDU) since its creation. Its first representative was Rudolf Seiters, who served from 1980 to 2002. Since 2002, it has been represented by Gitta Connemann.

Election	Member	Party	%
Unterems Constituency created from Emden – Leer and Emsland
1980	Rudolf Seiters	CDU	51.0
1983	Rudolf Seiters	CDU	56.8
1987	Rudolf Seiters	CDU	51.3
1990	Rudolf Seiters	CDU	56.6
1994	Rudolf Seiters	CDU	56.7
1998	Rudolf Seiters	CDU	49.4
2002	Gitta Connemann	CDU	47.4
2005	Gitta Connemann	CDU	47.1
2009	Gitta Connemann	CDU	45.2
2013	Gitta Connemann	CDU	54.7
2017	Gitta Connemann	CDU	50.0
2021	Gitta Connemann	CDU	44.4
2025	Gitta Connemann	CDU	40.5

== Election results ==
=== 2025 election ===
Federal election (2025): Unterems
Notes:	Blue background denotes the winner of the electorate vote. Pink background denotes a candidate elected from their party list. Yellow background denotes an electorate win by a list member, or other incumbent. A ✓ or ✗ denotes status of any incumbent, win or lose respectively.						
Party	Candidate	Votes	%	±%	Party votes	%	±%
CDU	✓ Gitta Connemann	79,773	40.5	▼3.9	64,643	32.8	▲2.9
SPD	Anja Troff-Schaffarzyk	44,288	22.5	▼6.0	42,893	21.7	▼12.2
AfD	Martina Uhr	40,000	20.3	▲12.5	41,176	20.9	▲12.7
Greens	Julian Pahlke	13,738	7.0	▼2.5	14,267	7.2	▼3.4
Left	Michel Rolandi	10,835	5.5	▲3.0	12,955	6.6	▲3.9
BSW					7,344	3.7	
FDP	Ferhat Asi	4,977	2.5	▼3.7	7,717	3.9	▼6.2
FW	Andreas Wilshusen	3,232	1.6		1,428	0.7	▲0.2
Tierschutzpartei					2,081	1.1	▼0.1
PARTEI					863	0.4	▼0.5
Volt					677	0.3	▲0.2
dieBasis					540	0.3	▼0.7
Pirates					271	0.1	▼0.2
BD					240	0.1	
Humanists					102	0.1	0.0
MLPD					27	0.0	0.0
Informal votes		1,448			1,067		
Total valid votes		196,843			197,224		
Turnout		198,291	83.5	▲9.8			
CDU hold	Majority	35,485	18.0	▲2.1			

=== 2021 election ===
Federal election (2021): Unterems
Notes:	Blue background denotes the winner of the electorate vote. Pink background denotes a candidate elected from their party list. Yellow background denotes an electorate win by a list member, or other incumbent. A ✓ or ✗ denotes status of any incumbent, win or lose respectively.						
Party	Candidate	Votes	%	±%	Party votes	%	±%
CDU	✓ Gitta Connemann	77,143	44.4	▼5.6	52,067	29.9	▼12.6
SPD	Anja Troff-Schaffarzyk	49,440	28.5	▲0.4	59,229	34.0	▲6.4
Greens	Julian Pahlke	16,434	9.5	▲4.7	18,576	10.7	▲4.8
AfD	Holger Kühnlenz	13,584	7.8	▲0.2	14,248	8.2	▼0.2
FDP	Ferhat Asi	10,763	6.2	▲1.8	17,671	10.1	▲2.3
Left	Kai Jesiek	4,358	2.5	▼1.9	4,650	2.7	▼2.7
Tierschutzpartei					2,044	1.2	▲0.5
PARTEI					1,649	0.9	▲0.2
dieBasis	Rafael Gil Brand	1,866	1.1		1,619	0.9	
FW					856	0.5	▲0.3
Pirates					534	0.3	0.0
Volt					334	0.2	
Team Todenhöfer					211	0.1	
NPD					161	0.1	▼0.1
Independent	Siegfried Balzer	159	0.1				
Humanists					103	0.1	
V-Partei3					97	0.1	0.0
du.					92	0.1	
ÖDP					58	0.0	0.0
LKR					31	0.0	
DKP					28	0.0	0.0
MLPD					18	0.0	0.0
Informal votes		2,079			1,550		
Total valid votes		173,747			174,276		
Turnout		175,826	73.7	▼1.2			
CDU hold	Majority	27,703	15.9	▼6.1			

=== 2017 election ===
Federal election (2017): Unterems
Notes:	Blue background denotes the winner of the electorate vote. Pink background denotes a candidate elected from their party list. Yellow background denotes an electorate win by a list member, or other incumbent. A ✓ or ✗ denotes status of any incumbent, win or lose respectively.						
Party	Candidate	Votes	%	±%	Party votes	%	±%
CDU	✓ Gitta Connemann	87,406	50.0	▼4.7	74,173	42.4	▼6.4
SPD	Markus Paschke (Note: Paschke entered the Bundestag on the SPD list after the resignation of Sigmar Gabriel in November 2019.)	48,959	28.0	▼3.2	48,194	27.5	▼3.4
AfD	Christoph Merkel	13,387	7.7		14,620	8.4	▲5.4
Greens	Harald Kleem	8,255	4.7	▼0.4	10,258	5.9	▲0.1
FDP	Marion Terhalle	7,758	4.4	▲1.8	13,629	7.8	▲3.8
Left	Bettina Kubiak	7,726	4.4	▲0.5	9,459	5.4	▲1.3
PARTEI	Marius Wolters	1,298	0.7		1,359	0.8	
Pirates					491	0.3	
Tierschutzpartei					1,185	0.7	0.0
NPD					421	0.2	▼0.6
FW					413	0.2	▼0.2
BGE					159	0.1	
DiB					147	0.1	
DM					144	0.1	
ÖDP					127	0.1	
V-Partei³					122	0.1	
MLPD					30	0.0	0.0
DKP					21	0.0	
Informal votes		1,553			1,390		
Total valid votes		174,789			174,952		
Turnout		176,342	75.0	▲3.2			
CDU hold	Majority	38,447	22.0	▼1.5			

=== 2013 election ===
Federal election (2013): Unterems
Notes:	Blue background denotes the winner of the electorate vote. Pink background denotes a candidate elected from their party list. Yellow background denotes an electorate win by a list member, or other incumbent. A ✓ or ✗ denotes status of any incumbent, win or lose respectively.						
Party	Candidate	Votes	%	±%	Party votes	%	±%
CDU	✓ Gitta Connemann	90,236	54.7	▲9.5	80,616	48.8	▲9.7
SPD	Markus Paschke	51,409	31.2	▲1.9	51,079	30.9	▲3.3
Greens	Harald Kleem	8,441	5.1	▼2.3	9,506	5.8	▼1.8
Left	Charlotte Lenzen	6,426	3.9	▼3.5	6,771	4.1	▼4.7
FDP	Hans-Michael Goldmann	4,288	1.6	▼6.9	6,537	4.0	▼8.8
AfD					4,870	2.9	
Pirates					2,218	1.3	▼0.4
FW	Ingo Tonsor	1,280	1.1		747	0.5	
NPD	Albert Wille	1,656	1.0	▼0.1	1,339	0.8	▼0.2
Tierschutzpartei					1,070	0.6	▼0.1
Independent	Ralf Lükensmeier	587	0.4				
PBC					281	0.2	
PRO					165	0.1	
REP					91	0.1	
MLPD					24	0.0	0.0
Informal votes		2,096			1,645		
Total valid votes		164,863			165,314		
Turnout		166,959	71.7	▲0.5			
CDU hold	Majority	38,827	23.5	▲7.6			

=== 2009 election ===
Federal election (2009): Unterems
Notes:	Blue background denotes the winner of the electorate vote. Pink background denotes a candidate elected from their party list. Yellow background denotes an electorate win by a list member, or other incumbent. A ✓ or ✗ denotes status of any incumbent, win or lose respectively.						
Party	Candidate	Votes	%	±%	Party votes	%	±%
CDU	✓ Gitta Connemann	73,405	45.2	▼1.9	63,545	39.1	▼1.4
SPD	Keno Borde	47,481	29.3	▼10.5	44,913	27.6	▼13.5
FDP	Hans-Michael Goldmann	15,470	9.5	▲4.8	20,731	12.8	▲5.0
Left	Franziska Junker	12,062	7.4	▲4.2	14,219	8.7	▲4.7
Greens	Tammo Lenger	11,981	7.4	▲3.8	12,222	7.5	▲3.4
Pirates					2,899	1.8	
NPD	Wilhelm Sudmann	1,862	1.1	▲0.1	1,707	1.1	0.0
Tierschutzpartei					1,149	0.7	▼0.2
RRP					648	0.4	
ÖDP					304	0.2	
DVU					152	0.1	
MLPD					28	0.0	0.0
Informal votes		2,392			2,136		
Total valid votes		162,261			162,517		
Turnout		164,653	71.3	▼6.9			
CDU hold	Majority	25,924	16.0	▲8.7			

=== 2005 election ===
Federal election (2005):Unterems
Notes:	Blue background denotes the winner of the electorate vote. Pink background denotes a candidate elected from their party list. Yellow background denotes an electorate win by a list member, or other incumbent. A ✓ or ✗ denotes status of any incumbent, win or lose respectively.						
Party	Candidate	Votes	%	±%	Party votes	%	±%
CDU	✓ Gitta Connemann	82,559	47.1	▼0.3	71,136	40.5	▼1.1
SPD	Clemens Bollen	69,621	39.7	▼2.8	72,167	41.1	▼3.6
FDP	Hans-Michael Goldmann	8,246	4.7	▼1.2	13,634	7.8	▲0.9
Greens	Meta Janssen-Kucz	6,246	3.6	▲0.2	7,242	4.1	▼0.1
Left	Ursula Stevens-Kimpel	5,742	3.3	▲2.4	7,137	4.1	▲3.3
NPD	Bernd Neumann	1,920	1.1		1,915	1.1	▲0.9
PBC	Jürgen Förster	979	0.6		724	0.4	▲0.1
Tierschutzpartei					893	0.5	▲0.1
GRAUEN					376	0.2	▲0.1
Pro German Center – Pro D-Mark Initiative					115	0.1	
BüSo					59	0.0	0.0
MLPD					33	0.0	
Informal votes		2,413			2,295		
Total valid votes		175,313			175,431		
Turnout		177,726	78.1	▼1.6			
CDU hold	Majority	12,938	7.4				
