= Hilkenbrook =

- Municipality
- Coat of arms

- Location of Hilkenbrook within Emsland district
- Interactive map of Hilkenbrook
- Location within Germany Location within Lower Saxony
- Coordinates: 52°59′N 07°42′E
- Country: Germany
- State: Lower Saxony
- District: Emsland
- Municipal assoc.: Nordhümmling

Government
  - Mayor: Bernhard Düvel (CDU)

Area
  - Total: 11.1 km^{2} (4.3 sq mi)
- Elevation: 10 m (33 ft)

Population (2025-12-31)
  - Total: 767
  - Density: 69.1/km^{2} (179/sq mi)
- Time zone: UTC+01:00 (CET)
  - Summer (DST): UTC+02:00 (CEST)
- Postal codes: 26897
- Dialling codes: 04493
- Vehicle registration: EL
- Website: www.Hilkenbrook.de

Hilkenbrook is a municipality in the Emsland district, in Lower Saxony, Germany.
