= Börger =

- Municipality
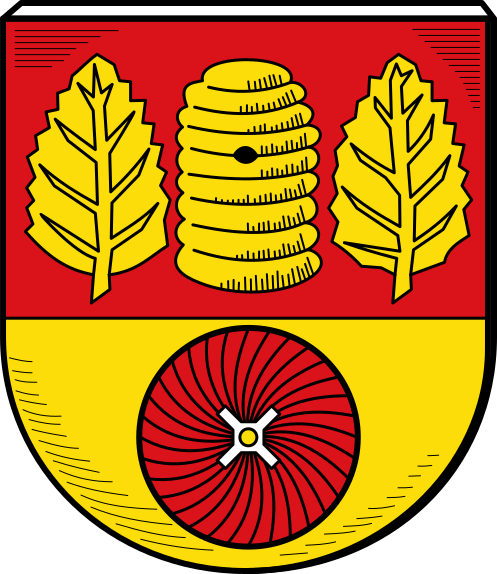
- Flag Coat of arms

- Location of Börger within Emsland district
- Interactive map of Börger
- Location within Germany Location within Lower Saxony
- Coordinates: 52°54′N 07°31′E
- Country: Germany
- State: Lower Saxony
- District: Emsland
- Municipal assoc.: Sögel

Government
  - Mayor: Jürgen Ermes (SPD)

Area
  - Total: 55.52 km^{2} (21.44 sq mi)
- Elevation: 40 m (130 ft)

Population (2025-12-31)
  - Total: 1,011
  - Density: 18.21/km^{2} (47.16/sq mi)
- Time zone: UTC+01:00 (CET)
  - Summer (DST): UTC+02:00 (CEST)
- Postal codes: 26904
- Dialling codes: 05953
- Vehicle registration: EL
- Website: www.boerger-huemmling.de

Börger (German pronunciation: [ˈbœʁɡɐ]) is a village and a municipality in the district Emsland in Lower Saxony, Germany. Börger is part of the Samtgemeinde of Sögel.

== History ==
=== Early history ===
An exact age of the village cannot be given. Northern European Germanic tribes may have settled in the area of the Northern Hümmling (Northern Emsland) about the birth of Christ, and it is commonly believed that the first documented mentioning of Börger was around the year AD 854. Therefore, the village celebrated its 1150 years of existence in 2004.

Nevertheless, it is known that people must have lived in the region of the Nordhümmling for about 4000 years because of archaeological discoveries dating to this time period. For instance, "Großsteingräber" and "Hügelgrabfelder" (Stone Tombs) can still be found in the area.

About AD 1 so called "Amsivarier" (people of the region of the Ems river called by the Romans) lived in the Emsland and on the Hümmling. The Romans, acting out of revenge after losing the Battle of the Teutoburg Forest, enslaved this small tribe. Shortly afterwards, at around 50AD the Germanic tribe of the Chauken (or Chatten) took over the region. At around 400AD the Saxons started to push into the region from the east, while the Frisians moved in from the north. Both tribes disputed the region through the Middle Ages, though the Saxons are believed to have had the control. Nevertheless, it is reasonable to say that all four tribes (Saxons, Frisians, Amsivians and Chauken) are ancestors of modern-day residents of Börger.

=== Foundation of the village ===
Börger is believed to have originated with Kaiser Karl the Great. In 854AD it was mentioned for the first time; at that time it was referred to as "Burgiri" and several decades later in 879 being renamed "Burgium". In the year 1160 another document called the village "Bürgeren". Linguists translate "Burgiri" as "high birch".

There were originally 18 farms in Börger, from which the village developed. The first settlement in Börger was probably a group of farms in the middle of the village (Dorfbusk). Later a nucleated village, Haufendorf, developed. According to rumor, two neighbourhoods developed and persist to this day.

=== Farmers of the Hümmling ===
Contrary to other riverside areas of the Middle Ages, the Hümmling was very scarcely populated and forested. Most of the population held cattle and farmed the fields. The people of the region never truly accepted the authority of the nobility, because settlements were difficult to travel between and often subject to pillages. Several revolts erupted due to the protest of imposed taxes and the lack of protection against pillaging neighbouring regions of the Dutch, Frisians and Stedinger.

In 1266 the people of the Hümmling tried to achieve protection by subordinating themselves to the Frisians. This resulted in failure; revolts occurred in 1340 and 1449.

In 1394, the region was subjected to another law. In this document the farmers of the North Hümmling subordinated themselves to the bishop of Münster when he gained power over Cloppenburg. According to the law, the bishop must provide protection from the pillaging of the settlements by other kings as well as roving gangs.

=== Wars and the Plague ===
During the Thirty Years' War, in 1647 Wahn, Lorup and six other villages at the Ems were burned down by pillaging soldiers. The population of Börger went into hiding in the swamps. It is being handed down that an inhabitant of Börger (Albert Dillen) was abducted and released after promising not to pillage the village by paying a ransom.

After the war, the Plague struck several times and especially in 1666. The population of Hümmling was devastated. The plague occurred in intervals since the 14th century and also hit Börger.

== The Church of Börger ==
The church tower in Börger was first mentioned in 1523, when the chapel was renovated. Therefore, it may be concluded that a church tower or chapel existed since before the year 1500: Bernhard Holtmann mentions the year 1490. The church was dedicated to the holy Joist (Jodokus). Its own religious district was granted in 1573; previously, it was a member of the district of Sögel.

In 1543 the Reformation arrived at the Hümmling. After a while the people of the Hümmling followed this movement and at this time Börger had a Protestant preacher, a former farmer and soldier. At around 1600 the entire Hümmling was protestant. In 1614 several farmers returned to the Catholic Church. In 1633 the Swedish entered the area and began persecuting the Catholic population. In 1659 it was declared that Börger would become Catholic again.

Börger could not sustain its own priest until 1652 because there was little or no surplus of food. The first priest was Matthäus Bödeker, who preached from 1652 to about 1658. The old church (Eschkirche) and the cemetery in Börger were expanded several times. In 1804, a major increase was necessary due to an increase of the population of the village. In 1890 the church was torn down because the new major St. Jodokus church was inaugurated in the centre of the village.

== Life of the general population ==
The region of Börger used to be 130 square kilometres in size before the daughter communities of Neubörger and Breddenberg formed. (The biggest community in the Kingdom of Hanover) Most of the region is sand and swamp, which is unusable for farming without fertilizer. The population of the region barely survived on crops grown in suitable regions, as well as cattle. Many citizens became beekeepers as well.

Still, the population was poor: There were many years of starvation, especially between 1840 and 1880. The poorest farmers, as well as hired help, were hit the hardest. Because of this, many residents moved to the Netherlands during the spring as peat diggers and mowers, until the crops were ready at home. The situation was still dire, and many decided to move across the Atlantic to the United States for a better life.

== Towns in the Börger Region ==
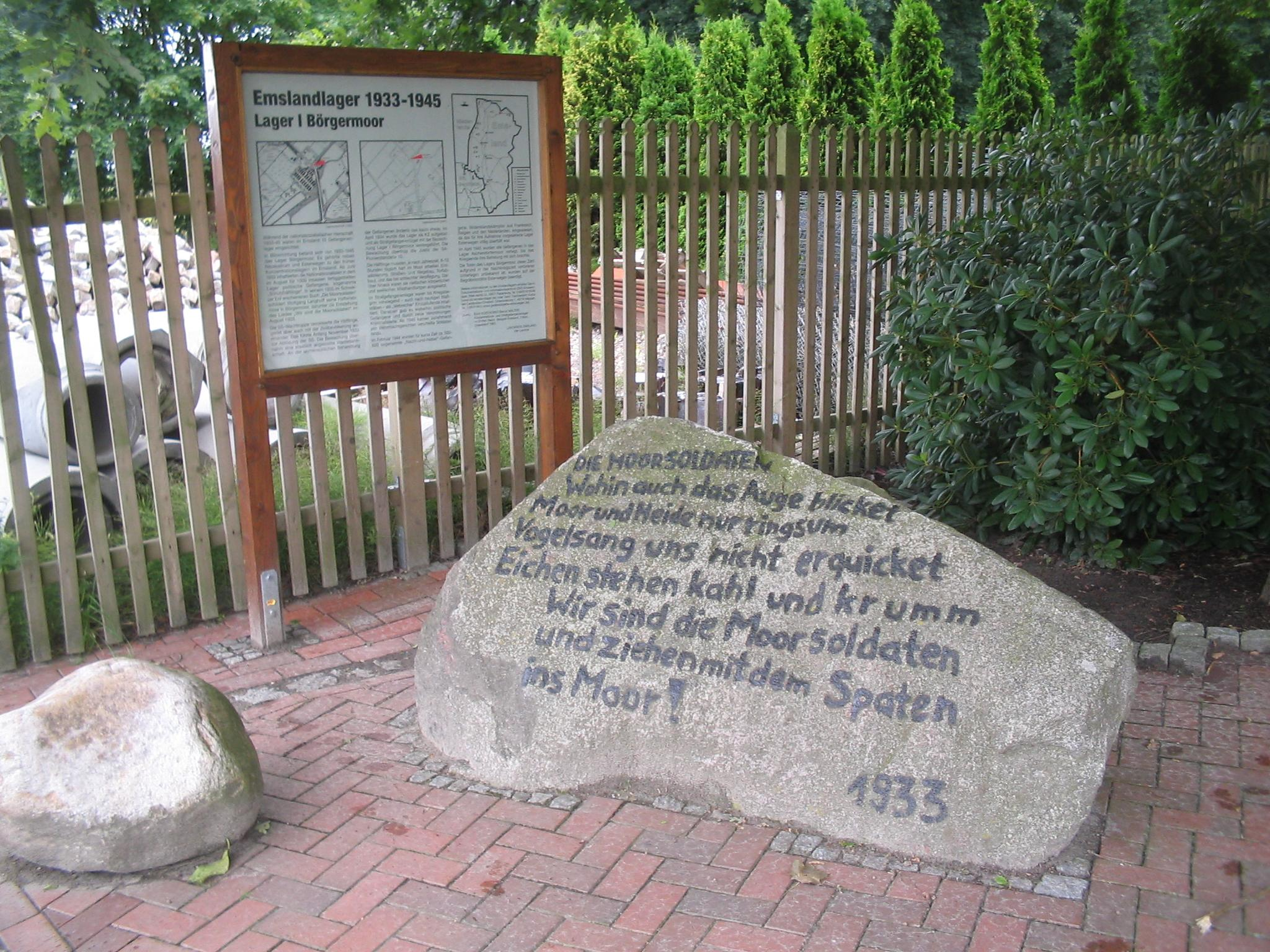
Memorial at the entry site of the former Nazi concentration camp Börgermoor

In the year 1788 two more villages were founded about 6 km northeast and northwest of the village. New farmers (Neubauern) and small farmers from Börger settled there. Out of these settlements the villages "Neubörger" and "Breddenberg" developed.

After ten years of free use the settlers had to pay high tributes to the nobility, the duchy of Arenberg, but also to the municipal of Börger. In the following years many settlers of the new villages had to sell their plots.

Although new villages were formed in the region in 1830, it still lost population because America seemed to be a more appealing place to live. With end of the feudal system in 1887 and the distribution of ownership of land to the small farmers, the economy began to improve. Following the example of the Netherlands, the northern part of Börger the cutting of peat became an integral part of the economy.

In 1879, farmers settled in the forest, establishing the village of "Börgerwald". In this year the population of Börger increased; this was the blooming time of artisanship. From 1930 to 1940 new settlements were established in Börgermoor. Börgerwald and Börgermoor are currently joined to form Surwold, with a population of approximately 5000 inhabitants. In 2004, Börger had about 3000 inhabitants, Neubörger about 1600 and Breddenberg nearly 1000. Börgermoor acquired worldwide prominence as the location of one of the first Nazi concentration camps, where the famous song of the Peat Bog Soldiers originated.
