= Johann Heermann (politician) =

German politician

Johann Heermann (19 August 1897 in Spahn, near Werlte, Lower Saxony – 28 August 1976 in Sögel) was a German politician of the Christlich Demokratische Union or CDU.

== Life ==
He initially attended a Volksschule before later being privately tutored and attending an agricultural college or 'Landwirtschaftsschule'. From 1945 until 1949 he was mayor of his hometown of Spahn. He was also later an elected member for the Landkreis Aschendorf-Hümmling. In 1947 he was elected a district councilor or Landrat for the Landkreis and held this post until November 1956. From 6 May 1951 to 5 May 1955 he was a member of the Landtag of Lower Saxony for a second time.

== Sources ==
- Barbara Simon: Abgeordnete in Niedersachsen 1946–1994: Biographisches Handbuch, 1996, Seite 146
