= Fürstenau (Samtgemeinde) =

- Samtgemeinde
- Location of Fürstenau within Osnabrück district
- Interactive map of Fürstenau
- Location within Germany Location within Lower Saxony
- Coordinates: 52°31′N 7°41′E
- Country: Germany
- State: Lower Saxony
- District: Osnabrück
- Seat: Fürstenau
- Subdivisions: 3 municipalities

Area
  - Total: 224.64 km^{2} (86.73 sq mi)

Population (2025-12-31)
  - Total: 15,790
  - Density: 70.29/km^{2} (182.1/sq mi)
- Time zone: UTC+01:00 (CET)
  - Summer (DST): UTC+02:00 (CEST)
- Website: www.fuerstenau.de

Fürstenau is a Samtgemeinde (collective municipality) in the district of Osnabrück, in Lower Saxony, Germany. Its seat is in the town Fürstenau.

The Samtgemeinde Fürstenau consists of the following municipalities:

1. Berge
2. Bippen
3. Fürstenau
