= Julian Pahlke =

German politician (born 1991)

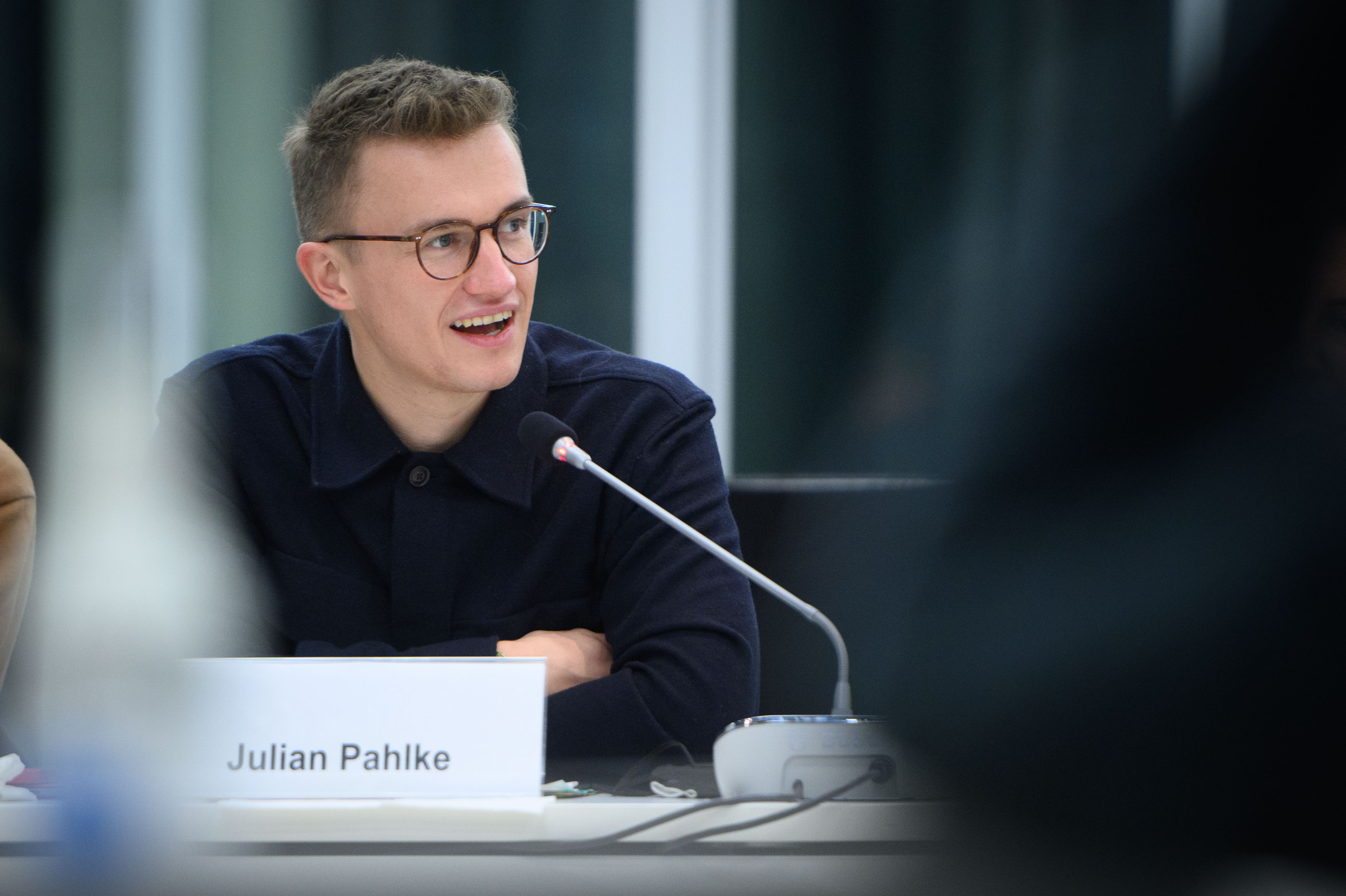

Member of the Bundestag
- In office 2021–2025

Personal details
- Born: 15 October 1991 (age 34)
- Party: Alliance 90/The Greens
- Education: University of Flensburg

Julian Nils Christoph Pahlke (born 15 October 1991) is a German politician of Alliance 90/The Greens who has been serving as a member of the Bundestag from 2021 to 2025.

== Early career ==
Pahlke was a crew member of the ship Iuventa of the organization Jugend Rettet for several years. From 2020 to 2021, he worked as parliamentary assistant to Claudia Roth.

== Political career ==
Pahlke became a member of the German Bundestag in 2021, representing the Unterems district.

In parliament, Pahlke has served on the Committee on Internal Affairs and Community and the Committee on European Affairs.

In addition to his committee assignments, Pahlke has been a member of the German delegation to the Parliamentary Assembly of the Council of Europe (PACE) since 2022. In the Assembly, he serves on the Committee on Migration, Refugees and Displaced Persons and the Sub-Committee on Migrant Smuggling and Trafficking in Human Beings.
