= Bockhorst =

- Municipality
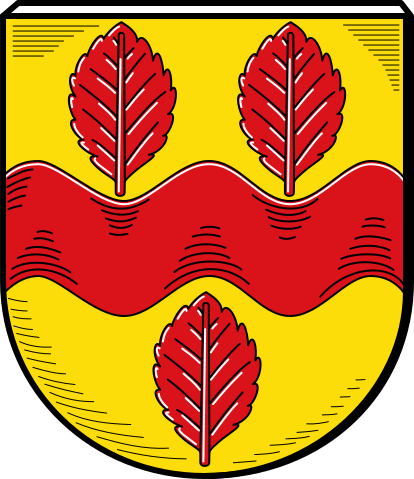
- Coat of arms

- Location of Bockhorst within Emsland district
- Interactive map of Bockhorst
- Location within Germany Location within Lower Saxony
- Coordinates: 53°02′N 07°35′E
- Country: Germany
- State: Lower Saxony
- District: Emsland
- Municipal assoc.: Nordhümmling

Government
  - Mayor: Manfred Mönnikes (CDU)

Area
  - Total: 18.19 km^{2} (7.02 sq mi)
- Elevation: 7 m (23 ft)

Population (2025-12-31)
  - Total: 1,011
  - Density: 55.58/km^{2} (144.0/sq mi)
- Time zone: UTC+01:00 (CET)
  - Summer (DST): UTC+02:00 (CEST)
- Postal codes: 26897
- Dialling codes: 04967
- Vehicle registration: EL
- Website: www.gemeinde-bockhorst.de

Bockhorst (German pronunciation: [ˈbɔkˌhɔʁst]) is a municipality in the Emsland district, in Lower Saxony, Germany.
