= Klein Berßen =

- Municipality
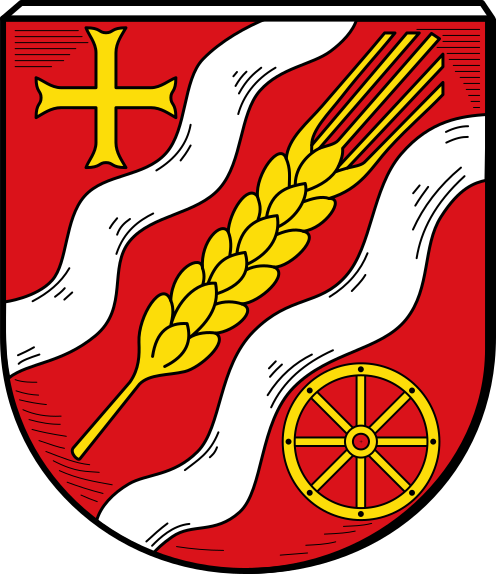
- Coat of arms

- Location of Klein Berßen within Emsland district
- Interactive map of Klein Berßen
- Location within Germany Location within Lower Saxony
- Coordinates: 52°46′N 07°27′E
- Country: Germany
- State: Lower Saxony
- District: Emsland
- Municipal assoc.: Sögel

Government
  - Mayor: Theo Kröger (CDU)

Area
  - Total: 16.93 km^{2} (6.54 sq mi)
- Elevation: 29 m (95 ft)

Population (2025-12-31)
  - Total: 1,199
  - Density: 70.82/km^{2} (183.4/sq mi)
- Time zone: UTC+01:00 (CET)
  - Summer (DST): UTC+02:00 (CEST)
- Postal codes: 49777
- Dialling codes: 05965
- Vehicle registration: EL

Klein Berßen is a municipality in the Emsland district, in Lower Saxony, Germany.
