= Voxtrup =

District of Osnabrück, Germany

Coordinates: 52.2528°N 8.1028°E

Voxtrup is a district in the south-east of Osnabrück, Germany, with a population of roughly 7,000 residents. It is home to the Evangelical Margaretenkirche and the Catholic St. Antonius Kirche.

== History ==
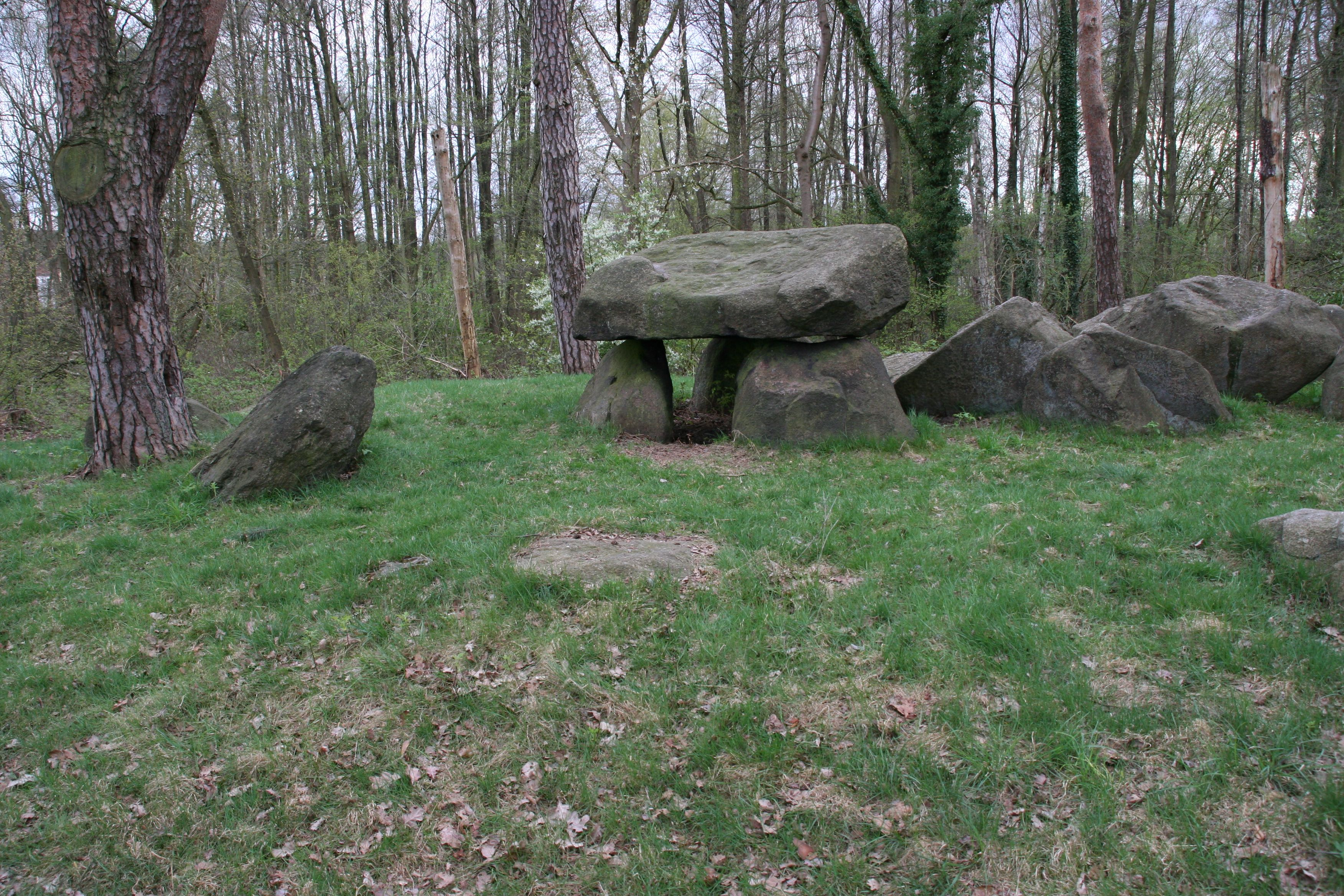
Voxtrup, Teufelssteine (Devil’s Stones) – part of the Route of Megalithic Culture

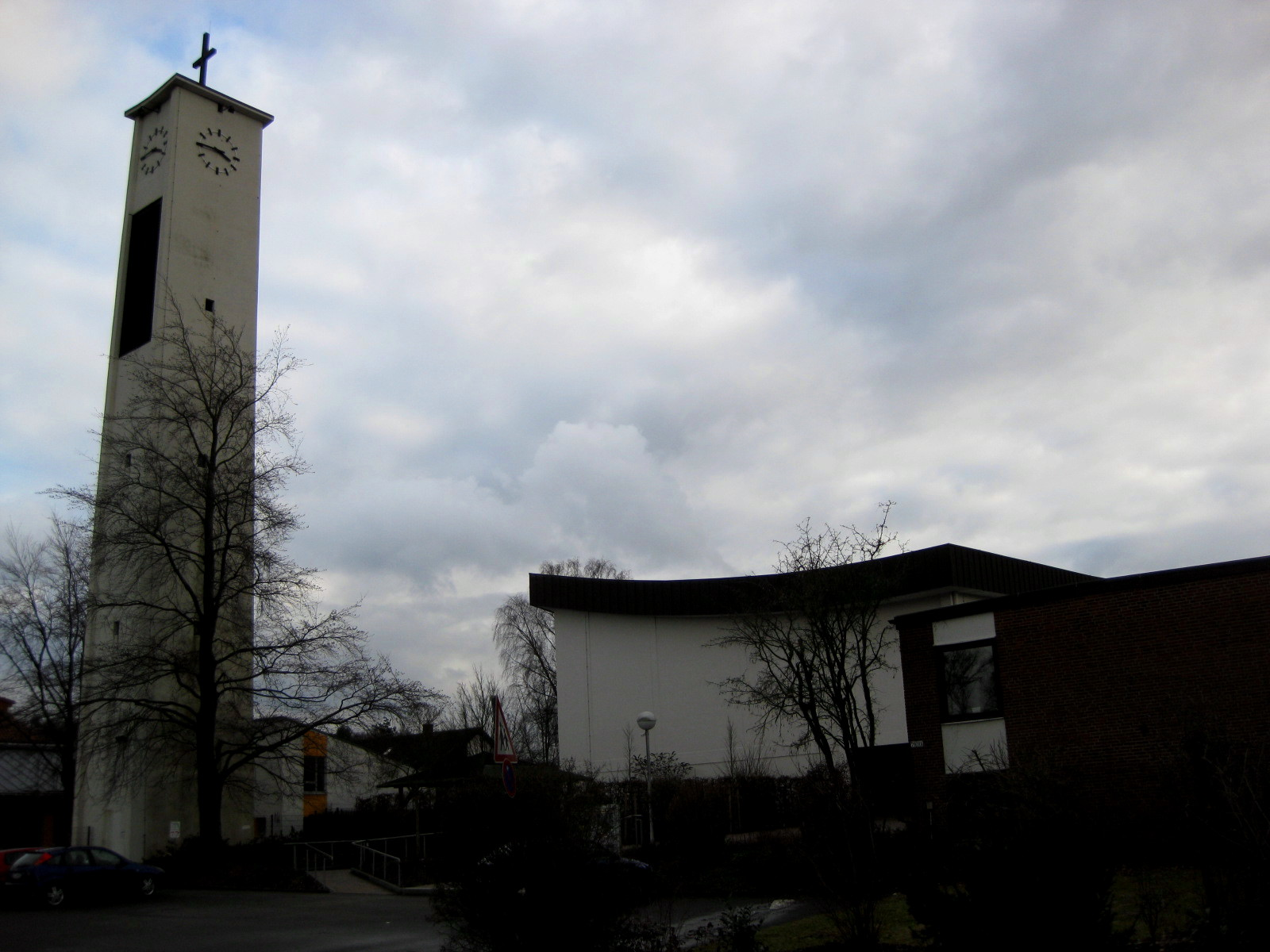
The Evangelical Margarethenkirche in Voxtrup

Voxtrup was first mentioned in records in 1088; however the earliest record only survives in the form of a transcription from the 14th century. It contains a legal notice stipulating that a nobleman named Eberhard was to transfer possession of an estate in Bevern to bishop Benno II in return for a payment of three pounds; its land would become part of the grounds of the Iburg monastery. The transaction was ultimately completed after the death of Benno, under his successor, Bishop Markwart. The case was heard at a place named “Vockestorp”. The court in Voccastorp (as it was named in a record dated 1090) was presumably located on the Mahlbrink around the area of the Gelshorn estate (today the Waldhof estate). Today’s Voxtrup finds its origins in the farming settlements of Molenseten, Düstrup, Hickingen and a settlement with the same name. In a record from 1147 the four settlements were named as a coherent body. It is almost certain that Voxtrup, Düstrup and Hickingen predate their first written records. Settlements are strongly believed to have existed in these areas in prehistoric times. The first estates in the farming settlements of Düstrup, Voxtrup and Hickingen had probably existed long before the Saxon-Westphalian regions were incorporated into the Frankish empire towards the end of the 8th century. Voxtrup is believed to have been named after the Fokko family. The district was originally home to three (or possibly five) separate estates: Arling, Hüdepohl, Werries, Brockmann and Strickmann.

Voxtrup was incorporated into Osnabrück on 1 July 1972. The northernmost part of the district used to lie within the former boundaries of Schinkel; this also used to be the location of the Lüstringen district railway station (until 1978), which was situated on the Osnabrück-Hannover line.

== Sport ==
The sports club “VfR Voxtrup” has existed since 1927, and today offers a wide range of sporting activities: namely badminton, football, basketball, mountain biking, tennis, table tennis, gymnastics, volleyball, basketball and hiking.

== Volunteer fire brigade ==
The Osnabrück-Voxtrup volunteer fire brigade (Freiwillige Feuerwehr Osnabrück-Voxtrup) was founded in 1938, and today is based at Holsten-Mündruper-Straße in the heart of the district. Its fleet is currently made up of five modern emergency vehicles, three of these being large ones. Alongside standard firefighting the volunteer fire service has the additional duty of providing technical assistance at the scene of traffic accidents. The ELW 2 emergency control vehicle is utilised with the support of colleagues from Haste and the Neustadt; this is classified as special water transport and is well-equipped to provide expert technical aid, especially in the areas of building collapse and saving individuals buried under rubble. Alongside the emergency division there is also a youth fire brigade, established in 1983. On 21 August 2010 Voxtrup also established the first Kinderfeuerwehr (children’s fire brigade) in the city and district area.

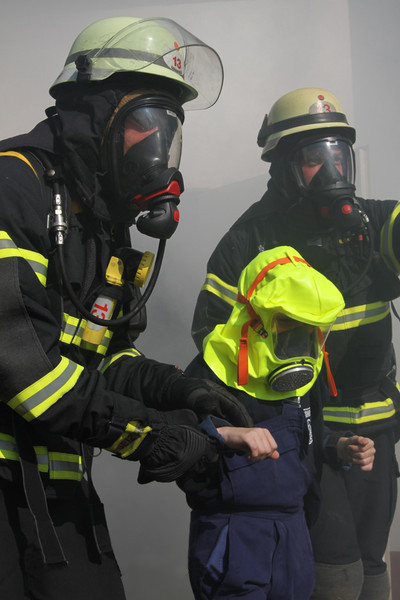
Übung der Feuerwehr Voxtrup
