= Gitta Connemann =

German lawyer and politician

Gitta Connemann MdB
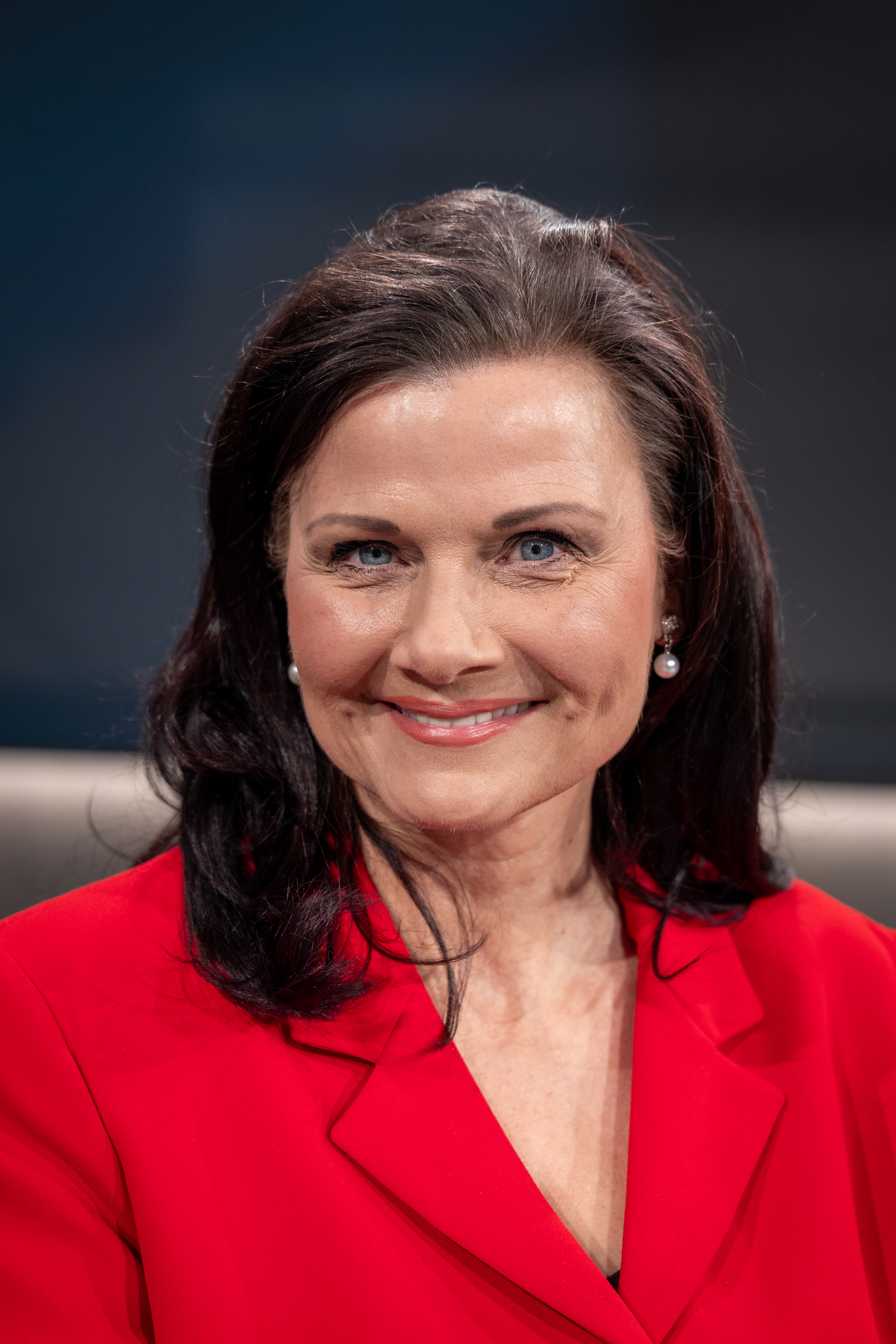
- Connemann in 2025

Member of the Bundestag; for Unterems
- Incumbent
- Assumed office 17 October 2002
- Preceded by: Rudolf Seiters

Personal details
- Born: Gitta Saathoff; 10 May 1964 (age 62) Leer, East Frisia, West Germany
- Party: Christian Democratic Union (since 1996)
- Spouse: Gerd Dählmann (m. 2015)
- Education: University of Osnabrück; University of Mainz
- Occupation: Lawyer • Politician

Gitta Connemann (née Saathoff; born 10 May 1964) is a German lawyer and politician of the Christian Democratic Union (CDU) who has been serving as a member of the German Parliament since 2002. Since 2021, she has been serving as the chairwoman of MIT, the pro-business wing in the CDU/CSU.

In addition to her work in parliament, Connemann has been serving as a Parliamentary State Secretary at the Federal Ministry for Economic Affairs and Energy (2025–2026) and at the Federal Ministry for Digital and State Modernisation (2026–present) in the government of Chancellor Friedrich Merz since 2025.

== Early life and career ==
Born to a Dutch mother and a German father, Connemann grew up on a farm. From 1984 until 1990, she studied law at the University of Osnabrück and the Johannes Gutenberg University of Mainz. She worked at a law firm in Darmstadt from 1993 to 1995. She later practiced as an independent lawyer with her own firm, Rickes Connemann, in Leer.

== Political career ==
Connemann has been serving as a member of the German Bundestag since the 2002 elections, succeeding Rudolf Seiters. She represents Unterems. Between 2005 and 2013, she served on the Committee on Labor and Social Affairs, where she was her parliamentary group's rapporteur on labor law. She was also a member of the Committee on Cultural Affairs and Media (2005-2009). From 2014 until 2015, she chaired the Committee on Food and Agriculture. She served as deputy chairperson of the CDU/CSU parliamentary group, under the leadership of successive chairs Volker Kauder (2015–2018) and Ralph Brinkhaus (2018–2021).

In addition to her committee assignments, Connemann has been serving as deputy chairwoman of the German-Israeli Parliamentary Friendship Group since 2005.

In the negotiations to form a coalition government under the leadership of Chancellor Angela Merkel following the 2017 federal elections, Connemann was part of the working group on municipalities and rural areas, led by Reiner Haseloff, Kurt Gribl and Michael Groschek.

In 2021, Connemann announced her candidacy to succeed Carsten Linnemann as chair of MIT, the pro-business wing in the CDU/CSU; she won over Thomas Jarzombek.

Since 2022, Connemann has been chairing – alongside Bernd Althusmann – a working group charged with drafting the CDU’s positions on energy policy.

== Other activities ==
- German Foundation for Active Citizenship and Volunteering (DSEE), Member of the Board of Trustees (since 2020)
- International Youth Meeting Center in Oświęcim/Auschwitz, Member of the Board of Trustees
- American Jewish Committee, Lawrence & Lee Ramer Institute for German-Jewish Relations, Member of the Advisory Board

== Political positions ==
Under the umbrella of the godparenthood program of human rights organization IGMF for political prisoners, Connemann has been raising awareness for the activities of Cuban political dissident Marta Beatriz Roque since 2014.

Connemann was one of only five CDU parliamentarians who voted against the government's draft law on introducing a national minimum wage for the first time in Germany's history in July 2014.

In April 2020, Connemann co-signed – alongside around 50 other members of her parliamentary group – a letter to President of the European Commission Ursula von der Leyen which called on the European Union to take in children who were living in migrant camps across Greece.

== Personal life ==
Connemann married fellow CDU politician Gerd Dählmann in Holtland in August 2015. The ceremony's guests included David McAllister and Julia Klöckner.
