= Fürstenau, Lower Saxony =

Fürstenau
- Town
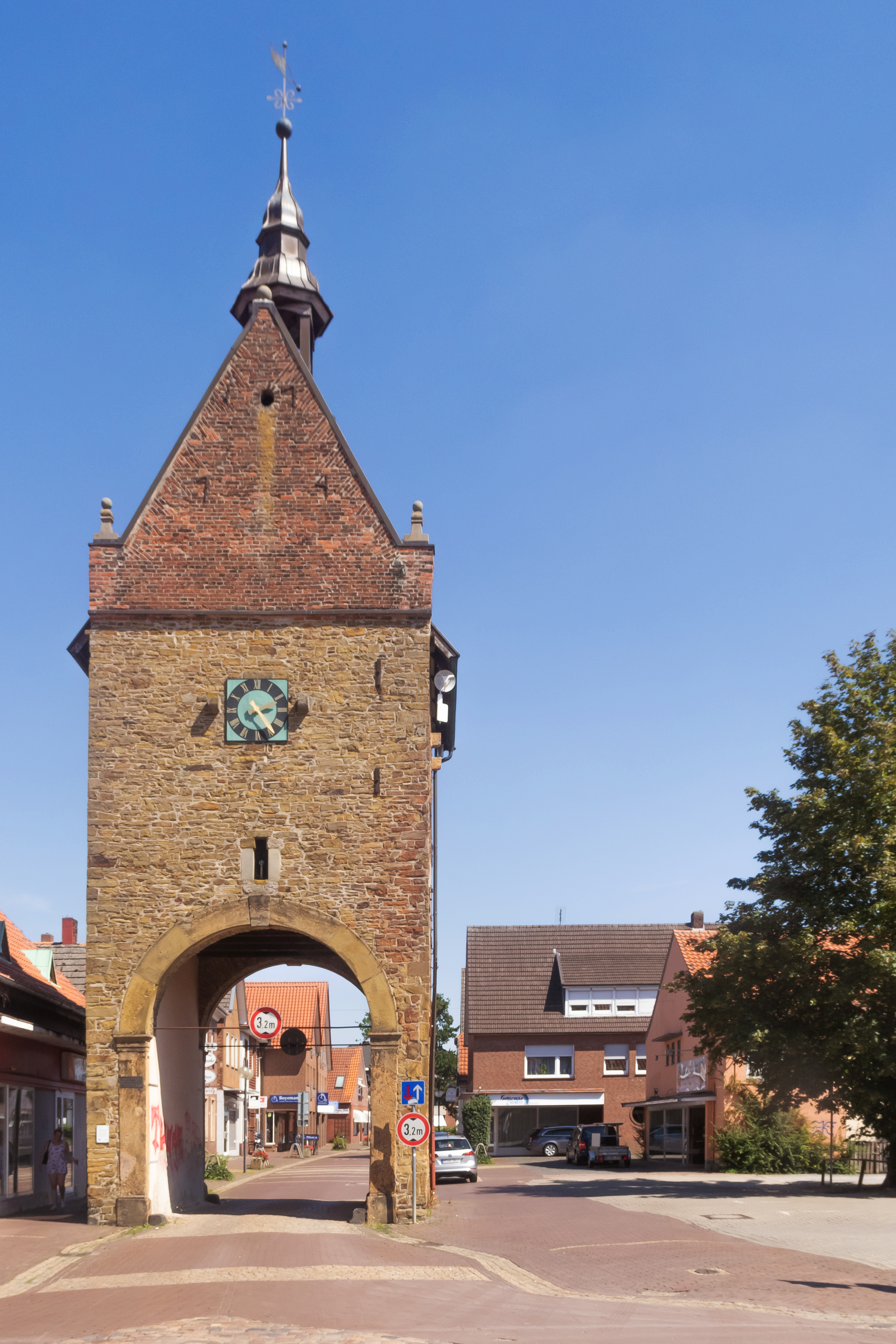
- Hohes Tor (towngate)

- Coat of arms

- Location of Fürstenau within Osnabrück district
- Interactive map of Fürstenau
- Location within Germany Location within Lower Saxony
- Coordinates: 52°31′N 07°40′E
- Country: Germany
- State: Lower Saxony
- District: Osnabrück
- Municipal assoc.: Fürstenau

Government
  - Mayor: Herbert Gans (CDU)

Area
  - Total: 78.65 km^{2} (30.37 sq mi)
- Elevation: 52 m (171 ft)

Population (2025-12-31)
  - Total: 9,415
  - Density: 119.7/km^{2} (310.0/sq mi)
- Time zone: UTC+01:00 (CET)
  - Summer (DST): UTC+02:00 (CEST)
- Postal codes: 49584
- Dialling codes: 05901
- Vehicle registration: OS, BSB, MEL, WTL
- Website: www.fuerstenau.de

Fürstenau (German pronunciation: [ˈfʏʁstənaʊ]; Low German: Fösnau) is a municipality in the district of Osnabrück, in Lower Saxony, Germany. It is situated approximately 40 kilometres (25 mi) northwest of Osnabrück, and 25 kilometres (16 mi) east of Lingen.

Fürstenau is also the seat of the Samtgemeinde ("collective municipality") Fürstenau.

St. Georg Evangelical Lutheran Church stands in the city market square. Pastor Anke Kusche tells the story of how during World War II the army required all the available metal for war products. The church bells which had rung daily for hundreds of years were taken down as required. But during the night one of them was stolen and buried until after the war in a farmer's field.

In the city clerks office hangs a painting of the city in the late 18th century. It is how the city still looks in December 2006.

== Notable people ==
=== Born in Fürstenau ===
- Franz Berding (1915-2010), politician (CDU)
- Ida Raming (born 1932), Catholic theologian and author
- Reinhard von Schorlemer (born 1938), politician, member for the Bundestag, forester and farmer

=== Connected to the city ===
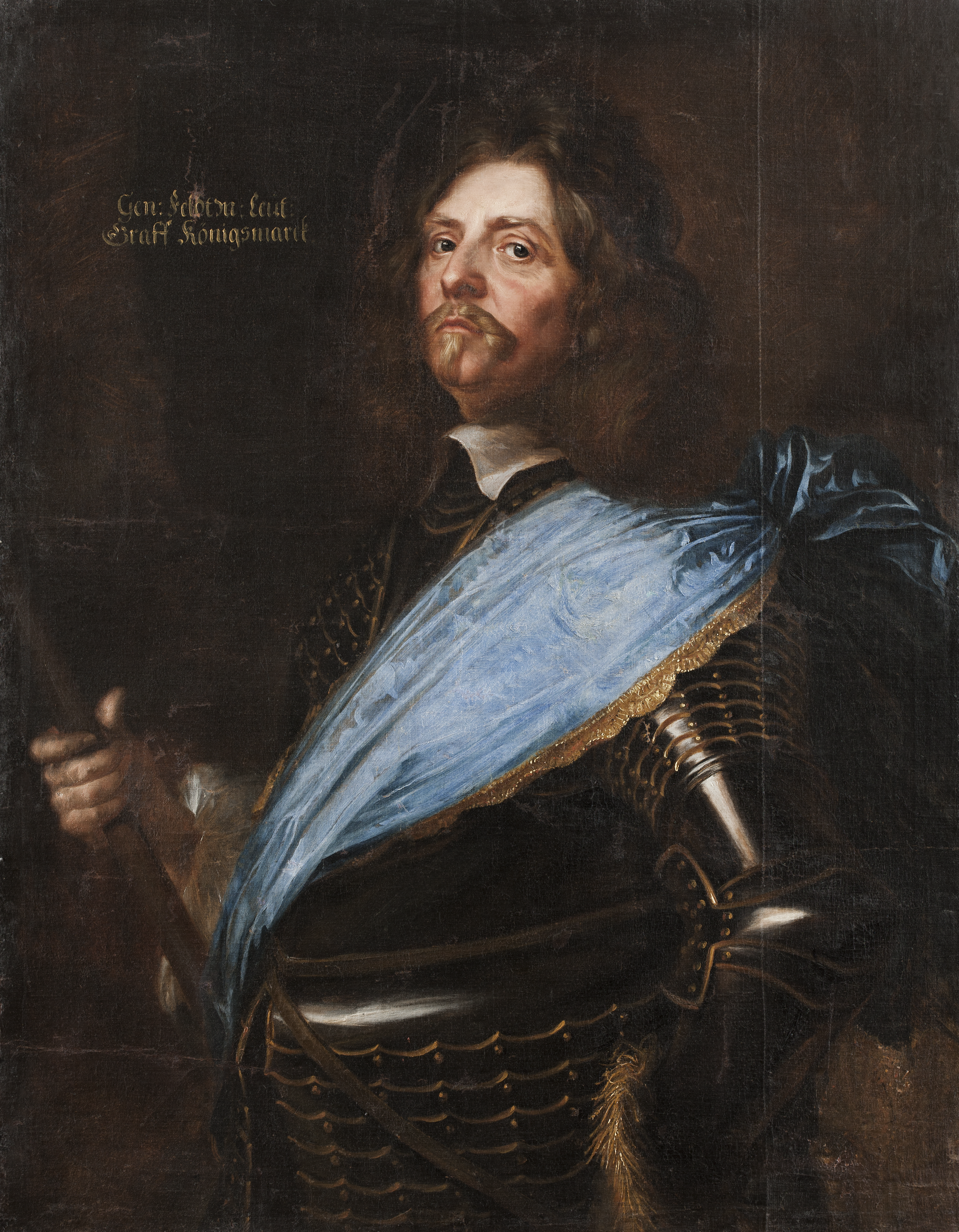
Hans Christoff von Königsmarck - 1651

- Eric of Brunswick-Grubenhagen (1478-1532) was from 1508 to 1532 principal bishop of Paderborn and Osnabrück and in 1532 elected bishop of Münster
- Henry of Saxe-Lauenburg (1550-1585), archbishop of Bremen (Henry III), Prince Bishop of Osnabrück
- Philip Sigismund of Brunswick-Wolfenbüttel (1568-1623) Prince-Bishop of Osnabrück and Verden.
- Hans Christoff von Königsmarck (1600-1663), German army leader in Swedish services
- Dirk Hafemeister (born 1958), equestrian and Olympic champion
- Luciana Diniz (born 1970) equestrian, show jumping
