= Nordhümmling =

- Samtgemeinde
- Flag Coat of arms

- Location of Nordhümmling within Emsland district
- Interactive map of Nordhümmling
- Location within Germany Location within Lower Saxony
- Coordinates: 52°58′N 7°37′E
- Country: Germany
- State: Lower Saxony
- District: Emsland

Government
  - Mayor (2018–23): Christoph Hüntelmann

Area
  - Total: 142.63 km^{2} (55.07 sq mi)
- Elevation: 13 m (43 ft)

Population (2025-12-31)
  - Total: 12,308
  - Density: 86.293/km^{2} (223.50/sq mi)
- Time zone: UTC+01:00 (CET)
  - Summer (DST): UTC+02:00 (CEST)
- Vehicle registration: EL
- Website: sg-nordhuemmling.de

Nordhümmling is a Samtgemeinde in the district Emsland in Lower Saxony, Germany. Its seat is in the municipality Esterwegen.

The following towns are situated in Nordhümmling:

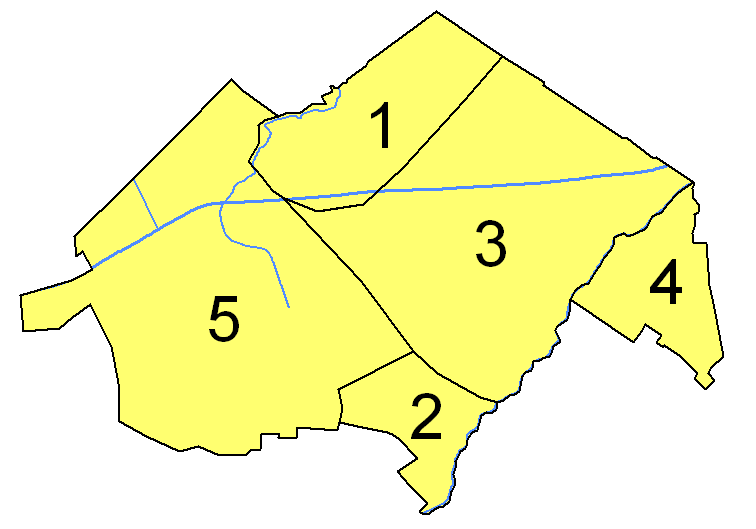

1. Bockhorst
2. Breddenberg
3. Esterwegen
4. Hilkenbrook
5. Surwold
