= Stavern, Germany =

Stavern
- Municipality
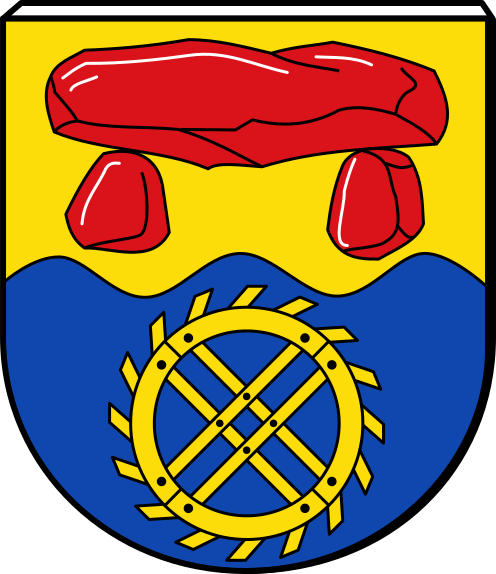
- Coat of arms

- Location of Stavern within Emsland district
- Interactive map of Stavern
- Location within Germany Location within Lower Saxony
- Coordinates: 52°47′N 7°25′E
- Country: Germany
- State: Lower Saxony
- District: Emsland
- Municipal assoc.: Sögel

Government
  - Mayor: Helmut Rawe (CDU)

Area
  - Total: 50.96 km^{2} (19.68 sq mi)
- Elevation: 20–51 m (66–167 ft)

Population (2025-12-31)
  - Total: 1,067
  - Density: 20.94/km^{2} (54.23/sq mi)
- Time zone: UTC+01:00 (CET)
  - Summer (DST): UTC+02:00 (CEST)
- Postal codes: 49777
- Dialling codes: 05965
- Vehicle registration: EL
- Website: www.stavern.de

Stavern is a municipality in the Emsland district, in Lower Saxony, Germany.
