= Berge (Lower Saxony) =

- Municipality
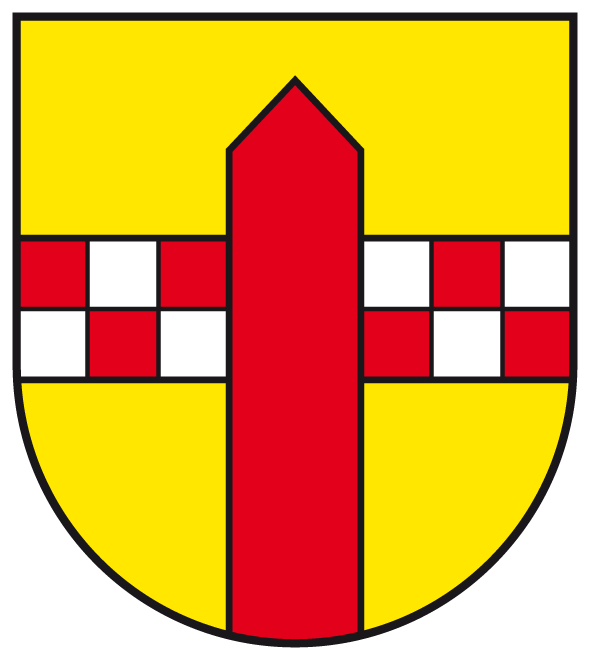
- Coat of arms

- Location of Berge within Osnabrück district
- Interactive map of Berge
- Location within Germany Location within Lower Saxony
- Coordinates: 52°37′N 7°43′E
- Country: Germany
- State: Lower Saxony
- District: Osnabrück
- Municipal assoc.: Fürstenau
- Subdivisions: 5

Government
  - Mayor: Volker Brandt (SPD)

Area
  - Total: 66.7 km^{2} (25.8 sq mi)
- Elevation: 69 m (226 ft)

Population (2025-12-31)
  - Total: 3,472
  - Density: 52.1/km^{2} (135/sq mi)
- Time zone: UTC+01:00 (CET)
  - Summer (DST): UTC+02:00 (CEST)
- Postal codes: 49626
- Dialling codes: 05435
- Vehicle registration: OS, BSB, MEL, WTL

Berge (German pronunciation: [ˈbɛʁɡə]) is a municipality in the district of Osnabrück, in Lower Saxony, Germany.
