= Breddenberg =

- Municipality
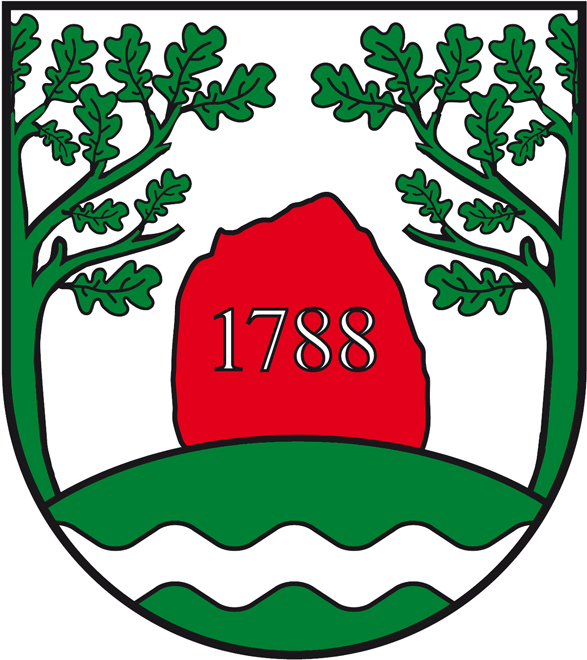
- Coat of arms

- Location of Breddenberg within Emsland district
- Interactive map of Breddenberg
- Location within Germany Location within Lower Saxony
- Coordinates: 52°57′N 07°35′E
- Country: Germany
- State: Lower Saxony
- District: Emsland
- Municipal assoc.: Nordhümmling

Government
  - Mayor: Hermann Hahnekamp (CDU)

Area
  - Total: 8.92 km^{2} (3.44 sq mi)
- Elevation: 12 m (39 ft)

Population (2025-12-31)
  - Total: 812
  - Density: 91.0/km^{2} (236/sq mi)
- Time zone: UTC+01:00 (CET)
  - Summer (DST): UTC+02:00 (CEST)
- Postal codes: 26897
- Dialling codes: 05954
- Vehicle registration: EL; alt ASD
- Website: www.Breddenberg.de

Breddenberg is a municipality in the Emsland district, in Lower Saxony, Germany.
