= Groß Berßen =

- Municipality
- Location of Groß Berßen within Emsland district
- Interactive map of Groß Berßen
- Location within Germany Location within Lower Saxony
- Coordinates: 52°46′N 07°30′E
- Country: Germany
- State: Lower Saxony
- District: Emsland
- Municipal assoc.: Sögel

Government
  - Mayor: Reinhard Kurlemann (CDU)

Area
  - Total: 20.76 km^{2} (8.02 sq mi)
- Elevation: 23 m (75 ft)

Population (2025-12-31)
  - Total: 726
  - Density: 35.0/km^{2} (90.6/sq mi)
- Time zone: UTC+01:00 (CET)
  - Summer (DST): UTC+02:00 (CEST)
- Postal codes: 49777
- Dialling codes: 05965
- Vehicle registration: EL

Groß Berßen is a municipality in the Emsland district, in Lower Saxony, Germany.
