= Bippen =

- Municipality
- Coat of arms

- Location of Bippen within Osnabrück district
- Interactive map of Bippen
- Location within Germany Location within Lower Saxony
- Coordinates: 52°35′N 7°44′E
- Country: Germany
- State: Lower Saxony
- District: Osnabrück
- Municipal assoc.: Fürstenau
- Subdivisions: 8

Government
  - Mayor: Helmut Tolsdorf (SPD)

Area
  - Total: 79.23 km^{2} (30.59 sq mi)
- Elevation: 60 m (200 ft)

Population (2025-12-31)
  - Total: 2,903
  - Density: 36.64/km^{2} (94.90/sq mi)
- Time zone: UTC+01:00 (CET)
  - Summer (DST): UTC+02:00 (CEST)
- Postal codes: 49626
- Dialling codes: 05435
- Vehicle registration: OS, BSB, MEL, WTL
- Website: www.fuerstenau.de

Bippen (German pronunciation: [ˈbɪpn̩]) is a municipality in the district of Osnabrück, in Lower Saxony, Germany.

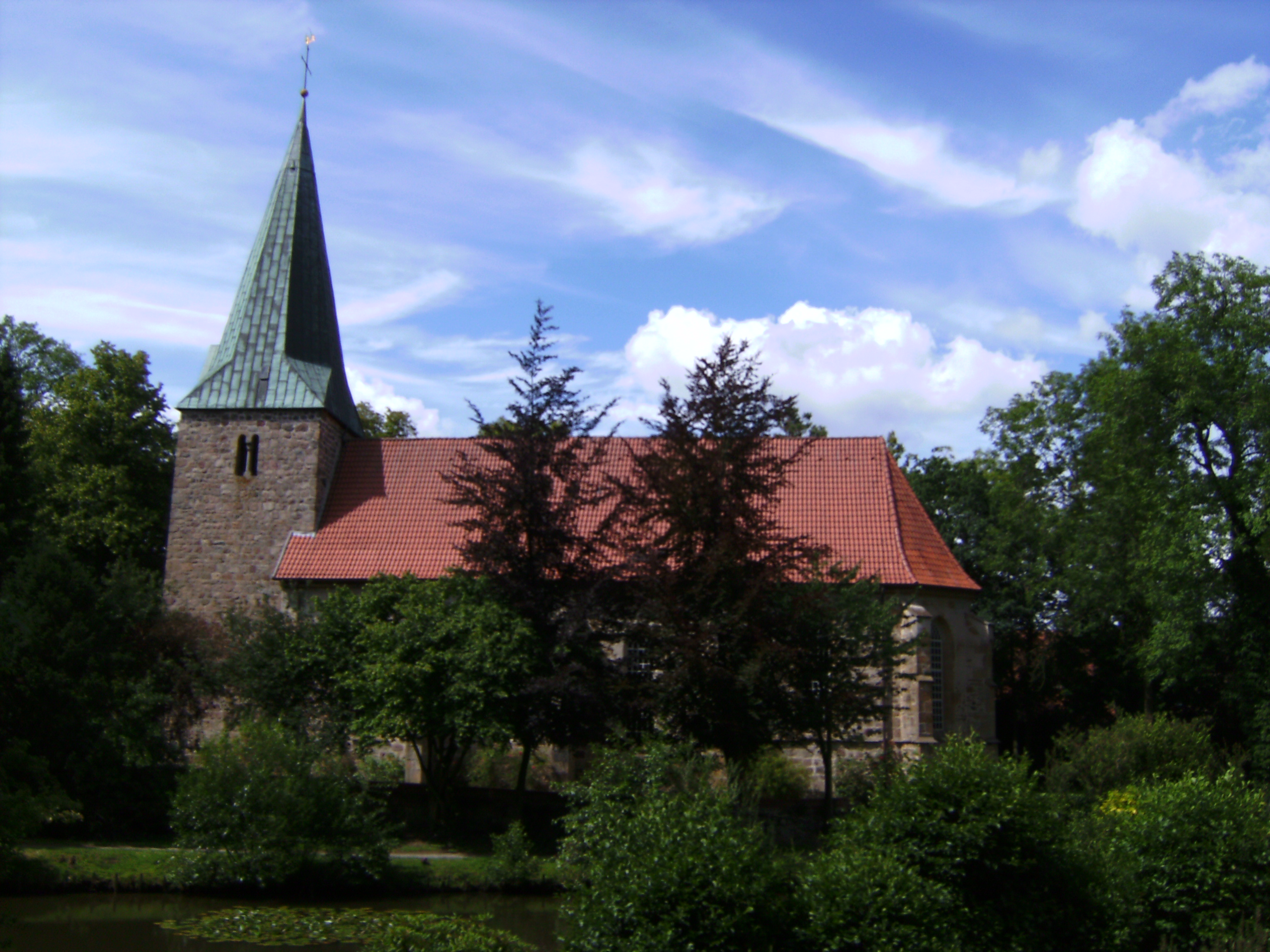
church: Sankt Georges Kirche
