= Sögel (Samtgemeinde) =

- Samtgemeinde
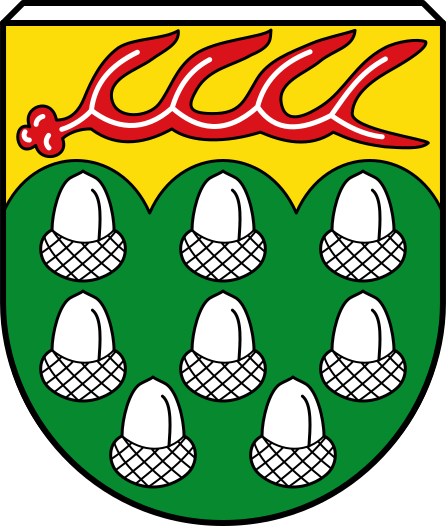
- Coat of arms

- Location of Sögel within Emsland district
- Interactive map of Sögel
- Location within Germany Location within Lower Saxony
- Coordinates: 52°51′N 7°31′E
- Country: Germany
- State: Lower Saxony
- District: Emsland

Government
  - Mayor (2021–26): Frank Klaß (Ind.)

Area
  - Total: 285.71 km^{2} (110.31 sq mi)
- Elevation: 35 m (115 ft)

Population (2025-12-31)
  - Total: 17,067
  - Density: 59.735/km^{2} (154.71/sq mi)
- Time zone: UTC+01:00 (CET)
  - Summer (DST): UTC+02:00 (CEST)
- Vehicle registration: EL
- Website: soegel.de

Samtgemeinde Sögel is a Samtgemeinde in the district Emsland in Lower Saxony, Germany. Its seat is the municipality Sögel.

The following towns are located in Sögel:

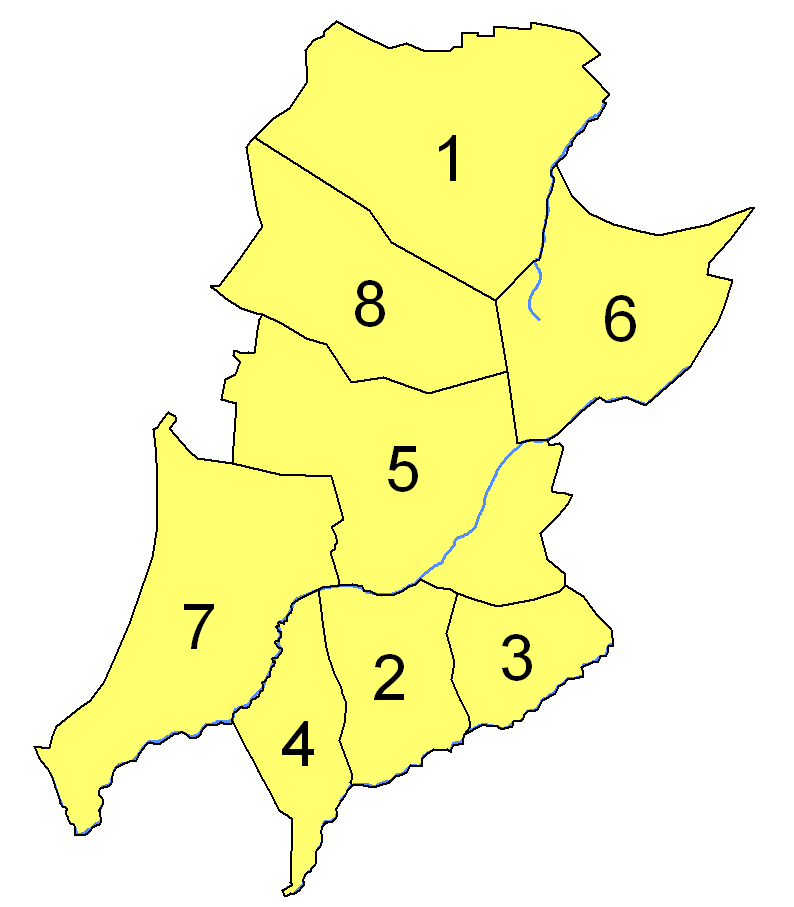

1. Börger
2. Groß Berßen
3. Hüven
4. Klein Berßen
5. Sögel
6. Spahnharrenstätte
7. Stavern
8. Werpeloh

== Gallery ==
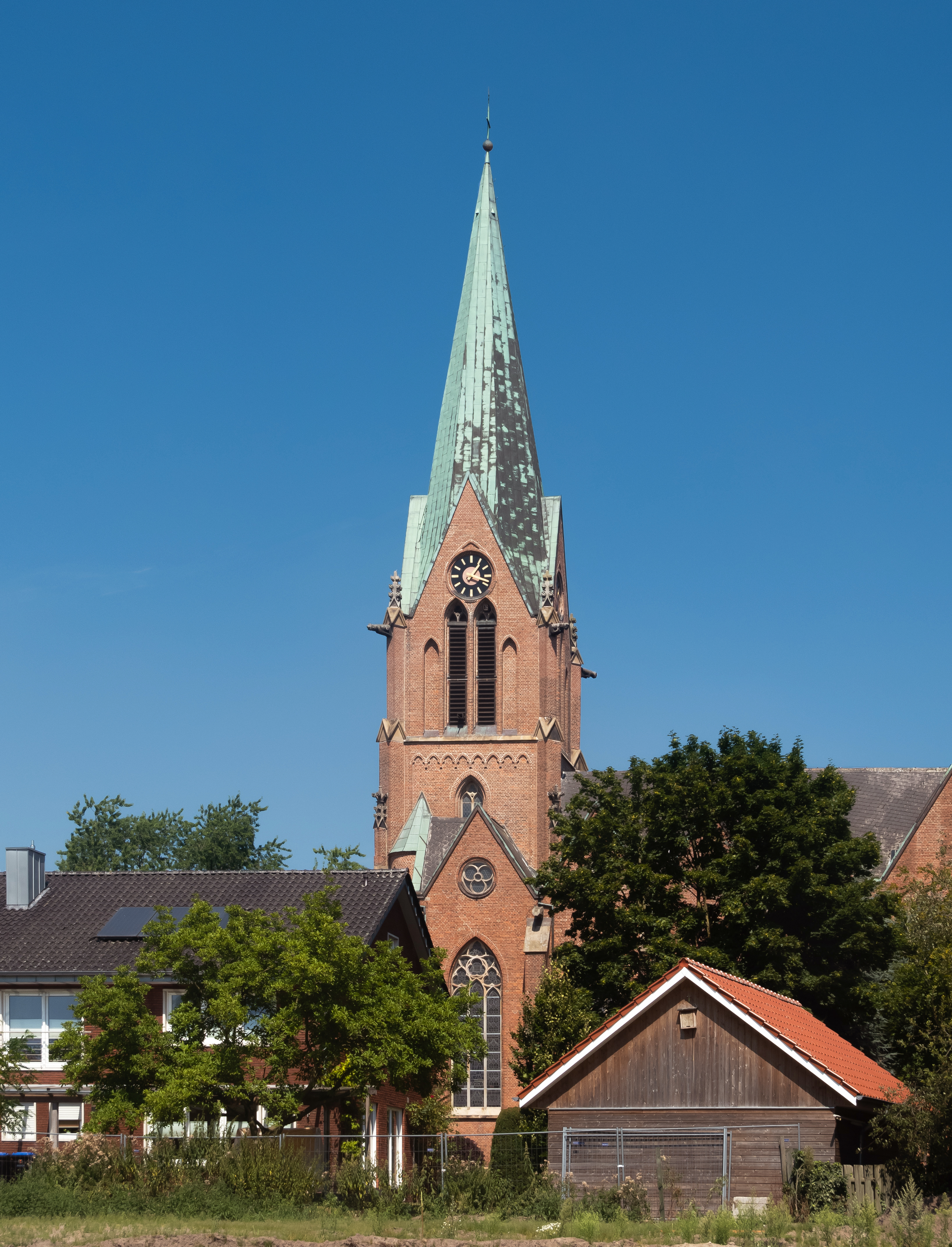
Sögel, churchtower (Sankt Jakobus Kirche)

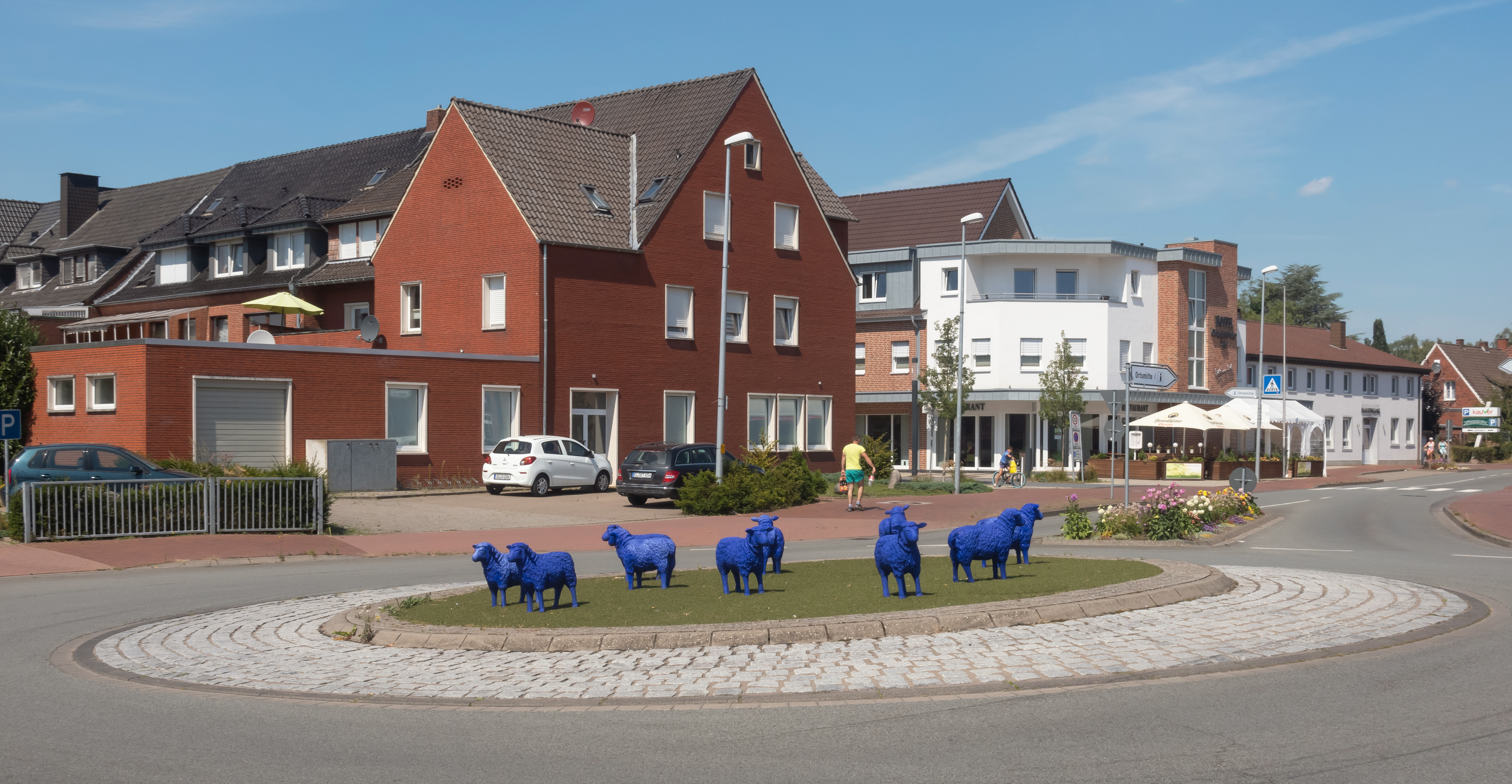
Sögel, blue sheep at the roundabout

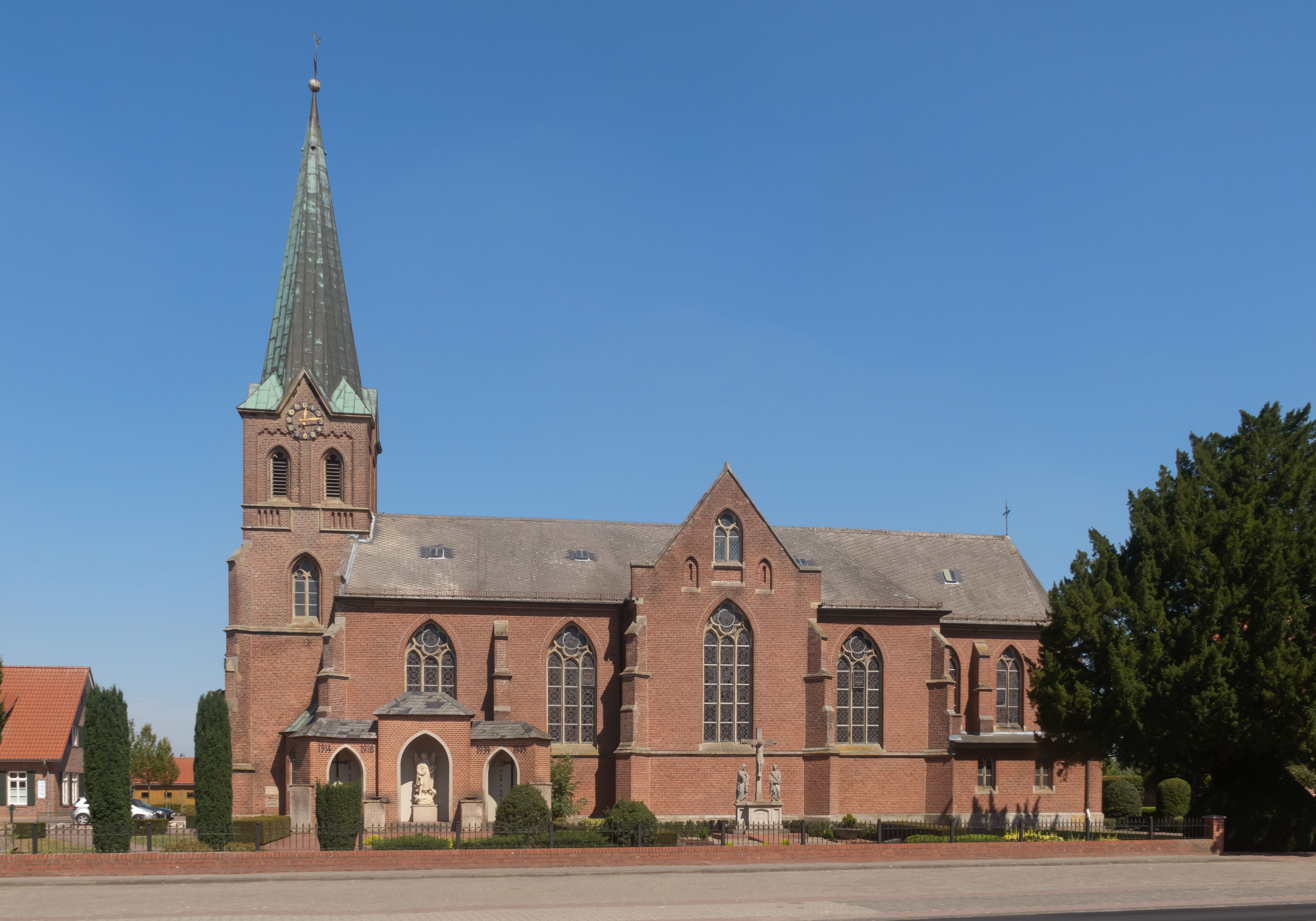
Klein Berßen, church: Herz Jesu Kirche

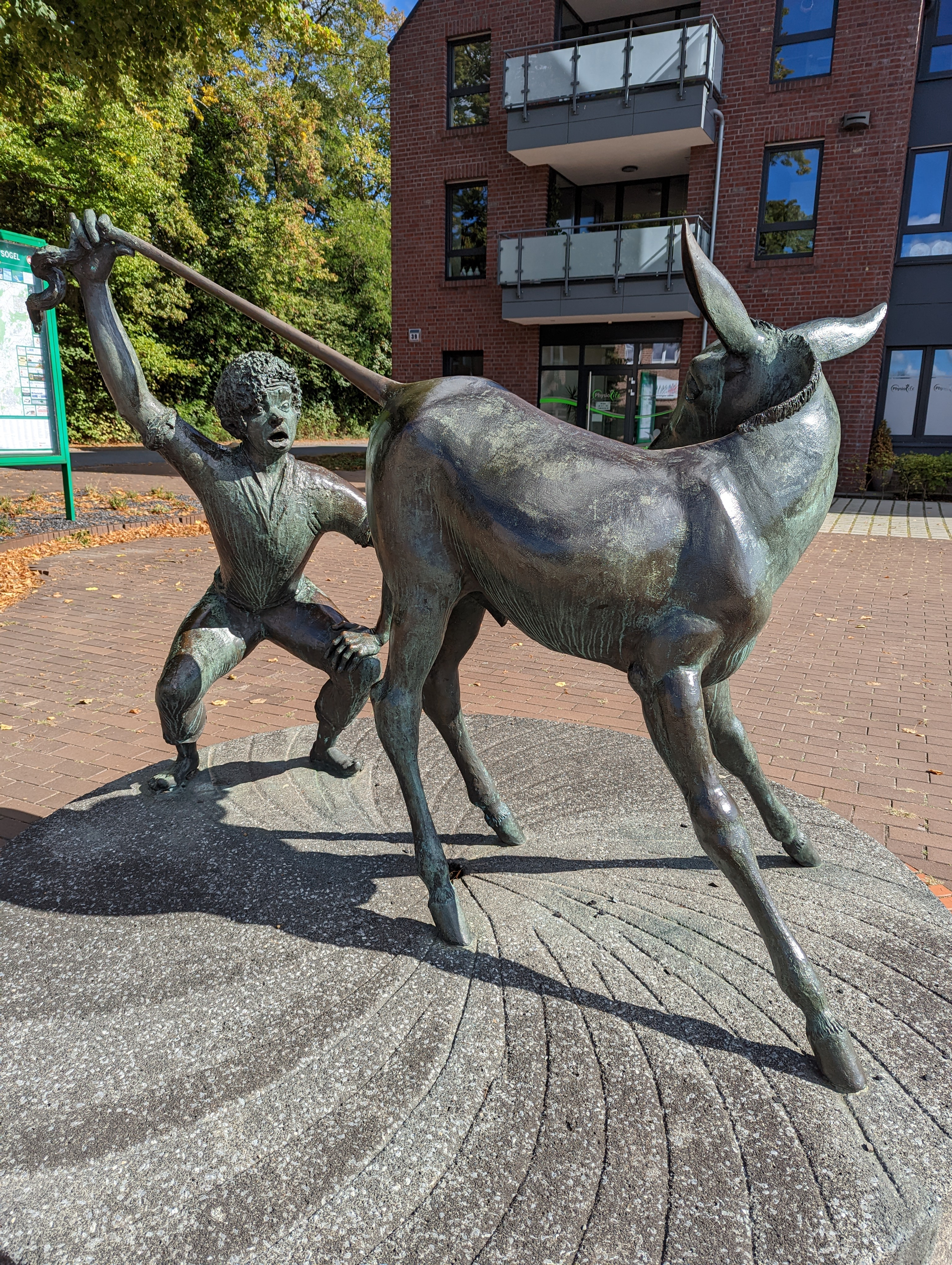
Donkey statue a short walk from the town square
