= Esterwegen =

- Municipality
- Flag Coat of arms

- Location of Esterwegen within Emsland district
- Interactive map of Esterwegen
- Location within Germany Location within Lower Saxony
- Coordinates: 52°59′31″N 7°38′1″E
- Country: Germany
- State: Lower Saxony
- District: Emsland
- Municipal assoc.: Nordhümmling

Government
  - Mayor: Hermann Willenborg

Area
  - Total: 49.53 km^{2} (19.12 sq mi)
- Elevation: 13 m (43 ft)

Population (2025-12-31)
  - Total: 5,387
  - Density: 108.8/km^{2} (281.7/sq mi)
- Time zone: UTC+01:00 (CET)
  - Summer (DST): UTC+02:00 (CEST)
- Postal codes: 26897
- Dialling codes: 0 59 55
- Vehicle registration: EL
- Website: www.esterwegen.de

Esterwegen is a municipality in the Emsland district, in Lower Saxony, Germany.

== Geography ==
Esterwegen lies in northwest Germany, less than 30 kilometres (19 mi) from the Dutch border and about 40 kilometres (25 mi) from the sea.

== Demographics ==
In 2015 the population was 5,280.

== Government ==
The mayor is Heinz Thomes.

== Concentration camp ==
In 1933 a concentration camp was established in Esterwegen. In 1936 the camp was dissolved and used until 1945 as a prisoner camp, for political prisoners and later for prisoners of the decree Nacht und Nebel.

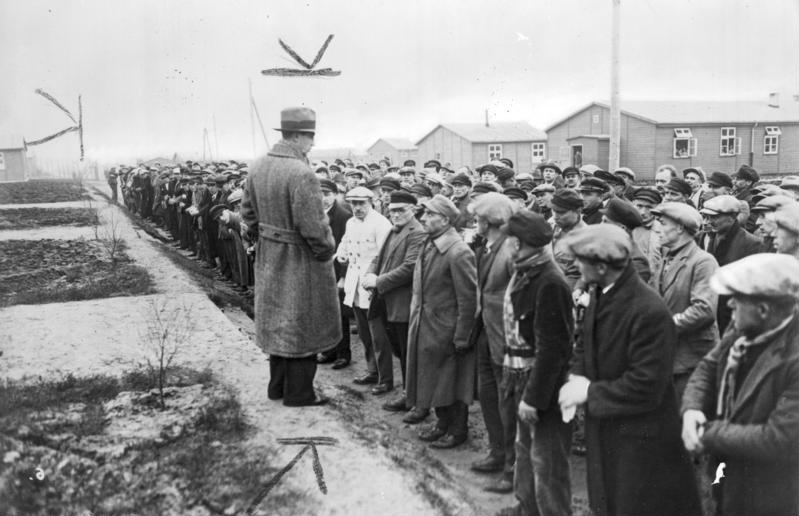
Inmates at Esterwegen.

=== Notable inmates ===
- Julius Leber, politician
- Carl von Ossietzky, journalist and Nobel Peace Prize Laureate
- Georg Diederichs, later Minister-President of Lower Saxony
- Karl Germer, Outer Head of the Order (OHO) of Ordo Templi Orientis
