= Hüven =

- Municipality
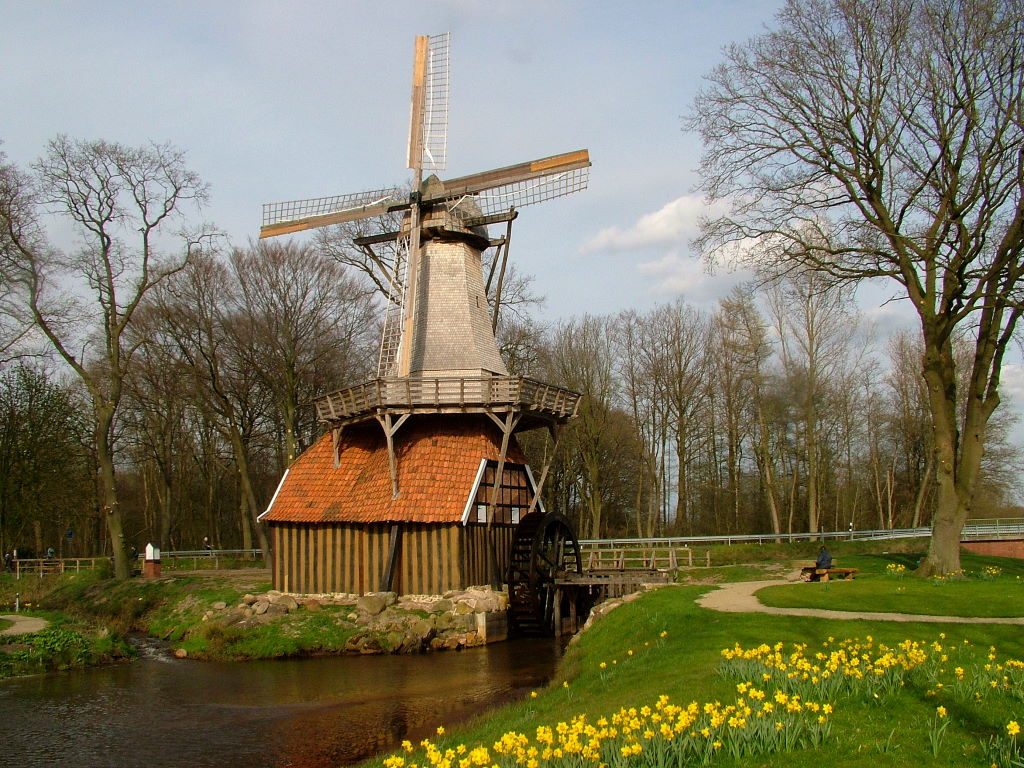
- Windmill and watermill

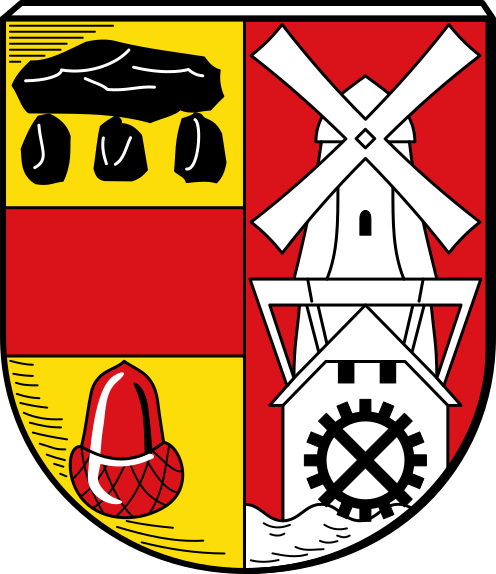
- Coat of arms

- Location of Hüven within Emsland district
- Interactive map of Hüven
- Location within Germany Location within Lower Saxony
- Coordinates: 52°47′10″N 7°33′6″E
- Country: Germany
- State: Lower Saxony
- District: Emsland
- Municipal assoc.: Sögel

Government
  - Mayor: Simone Borgmann (CDU)

Area
  - Total: 15.24 km^{2} (5.88 sq mi)
- Elevation: 30 m (98 ft)

Population (2025-12-31)
  - Total: 573
  - Density: 37.6/km^{2} (97.4/sq mi)
- Time zone: UTC+01:00 (CET)
  - Summer (DST): UTC+02:00 (CEST)
- Postal codes: 49751
- Dialling codes: 05952
- Vehicle registration: EL

Hüven is a municipality in the Emsland district, in Lower Saxony, Germany.
