= Sögel =

- Municipality
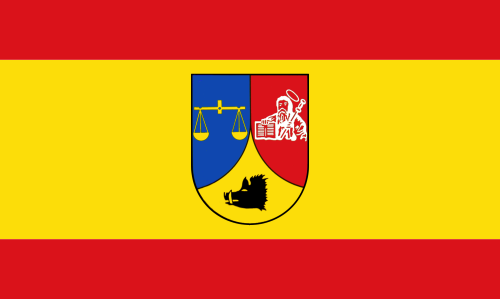
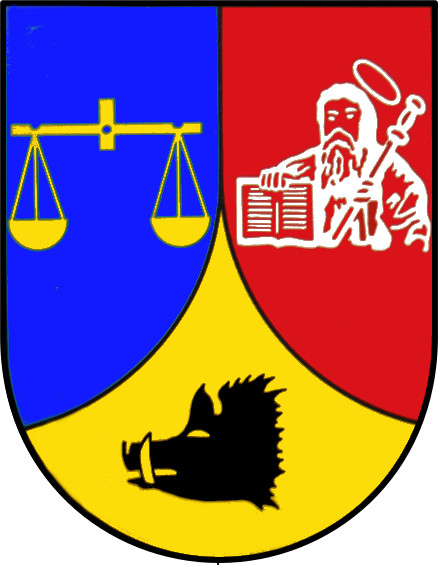
- Flag Coat of arms

- Location of Sögel within Emsland district
- Interactive map of Sögel
- Location within Germany Location within Lower Saxony
- Coordinates: 52°51′N 07°31′E
- Country: Germany
- State: Lower Saxony
- District: Emsland
- Municipal assoc.: Sögel

Government
  - Mayor: Heiner Wellenbrock (CDU)

Area
  - Total: 55.2 km^{2} (21.3 sq mi)
- Elevation: 35 m (115 ft)

Population (2025-12-31)
  - Total: 7,895
  - Density: 143/km^{2} (370/sq mi)
- Time zone: UTC+01:00 (CET)
  - Summer (DST): UTC+02:00 (CEST)
- Postal codes: 49751
- Dialling codes: 0 59 52
- Vehicle registration: EL

Sögel is a municipality in the Emsland district, in Lower Saxony, Germany. Sögel is most known for the Clemenswerth Palace, a hunting lodge built 1737–1749 by Johann Conrad Schlaun for Elector Clemens August.

From 1963 to 1992, Sögel's Muehlenberg Kaserne was the home of United States Army's 552nd U.S. Army Artillery Group. U.S. soldiers worked in collaboration with members of the German Bundeswehr, with their families living in designated housing on von Steuben Strasse and Im Eickel.

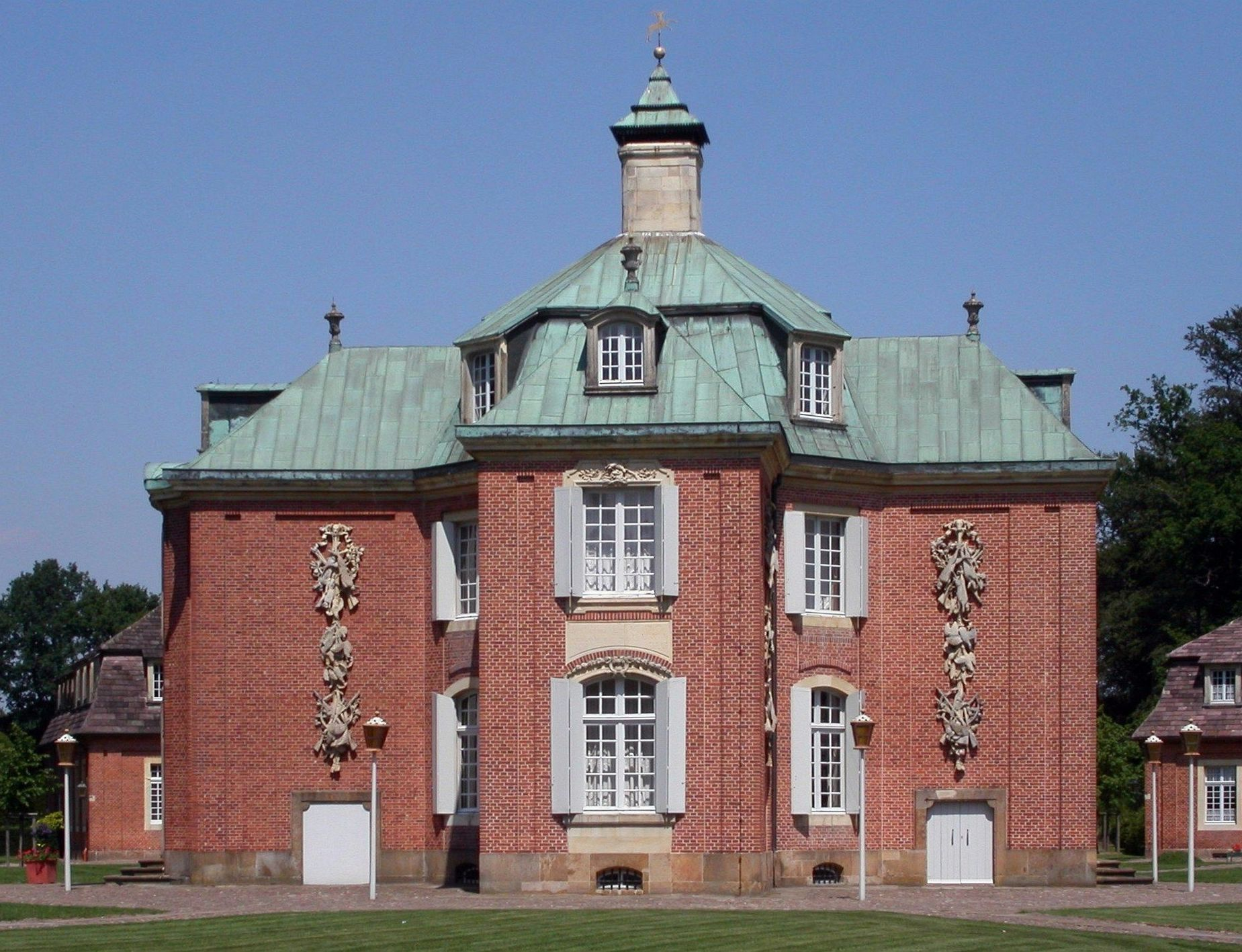
Clemenswerth Palace

== Personalities ==
=== Born in Sögel ===
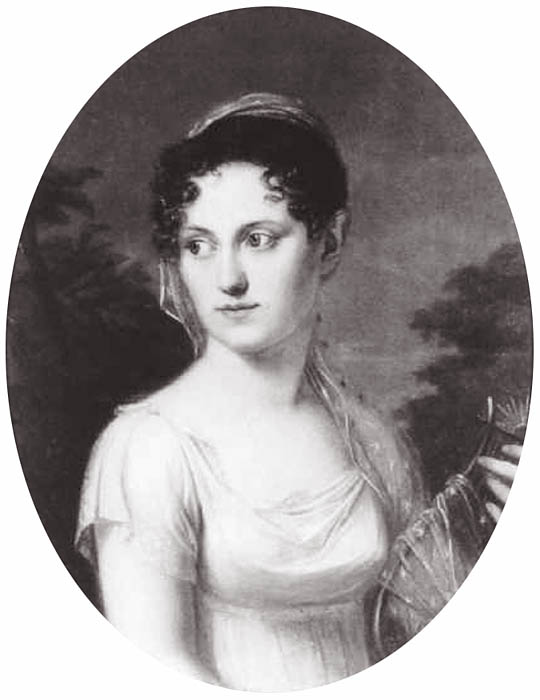
Catharina Busch

- Wilhelm Röpke (1873–1945), surgeon in Wuppertal, president of the German Society of Surgery
- Bernhard Rakers (1905–1980), Nazi war criminal

=== Died in Sögel ===
- Katharina Sibylla Schücking (1791–1831), poet
- Johann Heermann (1897–1976), politician, MdL

=== World War II ===
Much of the centre of Sögel was deliberately destroyed by the Canadian Army after the town was captured in April 1945.
