= Spahnharrenstätte =

- Municipality
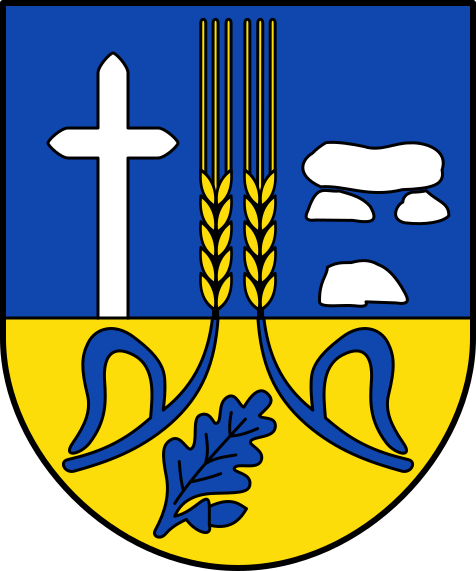
- Coat of arms

- Location of Spahnharrenstätte within Emsland district
- Interactive map of Spahnharrenstätte
- Location within Germany Location within Lower Saxony
- Coordinates: 52°52′13″N 7°36′3″E
- Country: Germany
- State: Lower Saxony
- District: Emsland
- Municipal assoc.: Sögel

Government
  - Mayor: Reinhard Tinpker

Area
  - Total: 36.07 km^{2} (13.93 sq mi)
- Elevation: 36 m (118 ft)

Population (2025-12-31)
  - Total: 1,507
  - Density: 41.78/km^{2} (108.2/sq mi)
- Time zone: UTC+01:00 (CET)
  - Summer (DST): UTC+02:00 (CEST)
- Postal codes: 49751
- Dialling codes: 05951/ 05952
- Vehicle registration: EL

Spahnharrenstätte is a municipality in the Emsland district, in Lower Saxony, Germany.
