= Surwold =

- Municipality
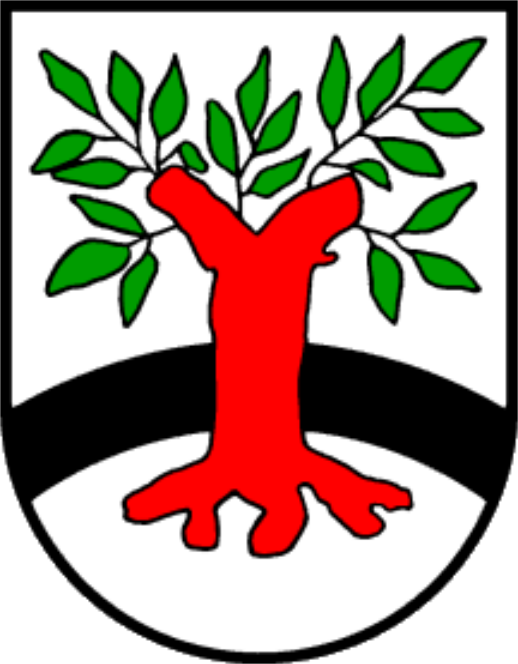
- Coat of arms

- Location of Surwold within Emsland district
- Interactive map of Surwold
- Location within Germany Location within Lower Saxony
- Coordinates: 52°57′N 7°31′E
- Country: Germany
- State: Lower Saxony
- District: Emsland
- Municipal assoc.: Nordhümmling

Government
  - Mayor: Andrea Schmidt (CDU)

Area
  - Total: 54.89 km^{2} (21.19 sq mi)
- Elevation: 25 m (82 ft)

Population (2025-12-31)
  - Total: 4,331
  - Density: 78.90/km^{2} (204.4/sq mi)
- Time zone: UTC+01:00 (CET)
  - Summer (DST): UTC+02:00 (CEST)
- Postal codes: 26903
- Dialling codes: 0 49 65
- Vehicle registration: EL
- Website: www.surwold.de

Surwold is a municipality in the Emsland district, in Lower Saxony, Germany.

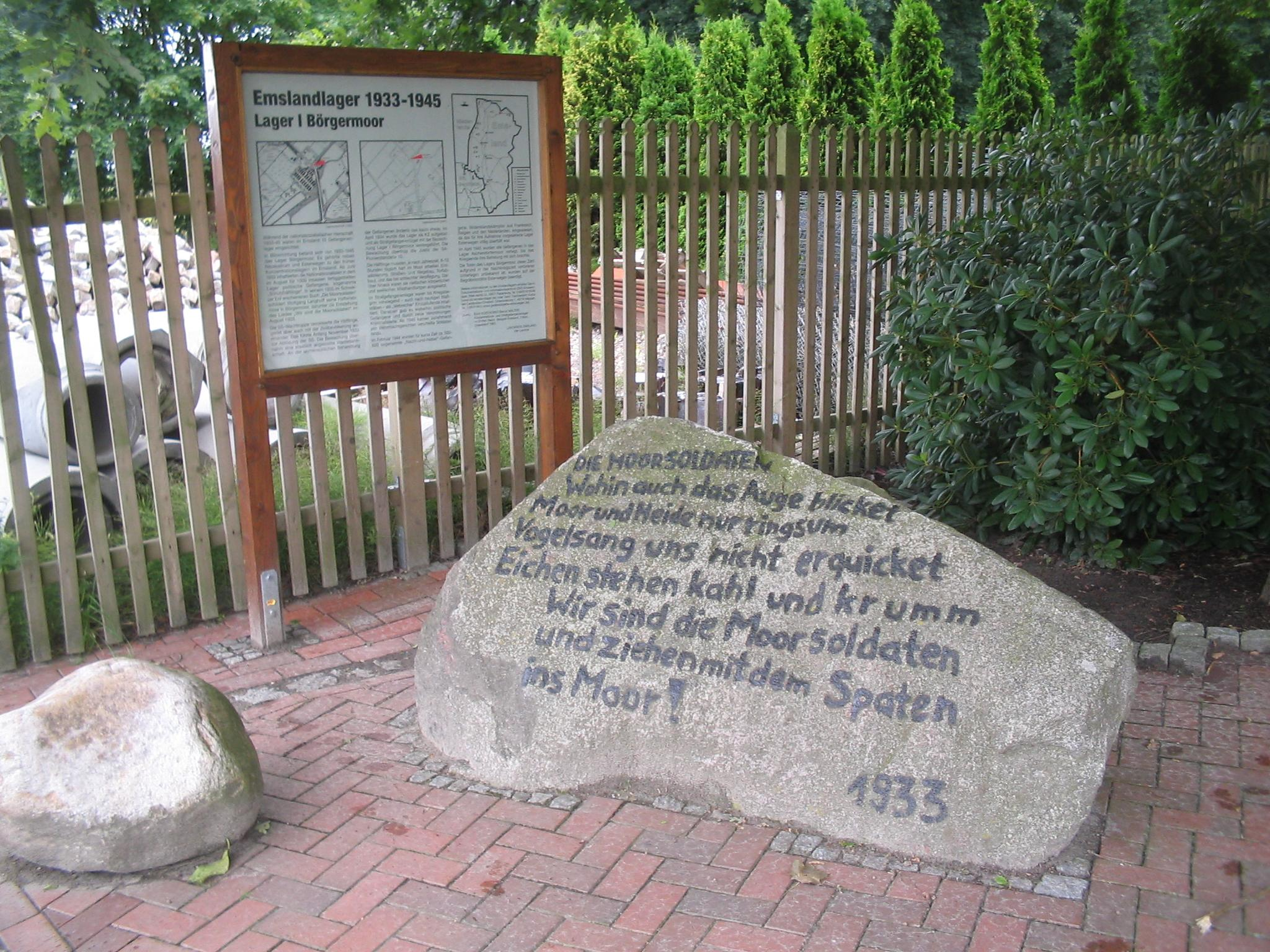
Memorial at the entry site of the former Nazi concentration camp Börgermoor
