= Werpeloh =

- Municipality
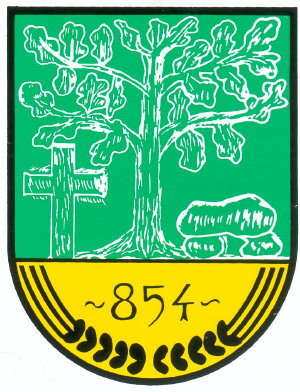
- Coat of arms

- Location of Werpeloh within Emsland district
- Interactive map of Werpeloh
- Location within Germany Location within Lower Saxony
- Coordinates: 52°53′N 07°30′E
- Country: Germany
- State: Lower Saxony
- District: Emsland
- Municipal assoc.: Sögel

Government
  - Mayor: Johann Geerswilken (CDU)

Area
  - Total: 35.34 km^{2} (13.64 sq mi)
- Elevation: 50 m (160 ft)

Population (2025-12-31)
  - Total: 1,179
  - Density: 33.36/km^{2} (86.41/sq mi)
- Time zone: UTC+01:00 (CET)
  - Summer (DST): UTC+02:00 (CEST)
- Postal codes: 49751
- Dialling codes: 05952
- Vehicle registration: EL

Werpeloh is a municipality in the Emsland district, in Lower Saxony, Germany.
