= Jümme =

- Samtgemeinde
- Coat of arms

- Location of Jümme within Leer district
- Interactive map of Jümme
- Location within Germany Location within Lower Saxony
- Coordinates: 53°14′N 7°38′E
- Country: Germany
- State: Lower Saxony
- District: Leer
- Subdivisions: 3

Government
  - Mayor (2021–26): Christoph Busboom (Ind.)

Population (2025-12-31)
  - Total: 6,689
- Time zone: UTC+01:00 (CET)
  - Summer (DST): UTC+02:00 (CEST)
- Website: www.juemme.de

Jümme is a collective municipality (Samtgemeinde) in the district of Leer in the German state of Lower Saxony. It is named after the River Jümme which flows through all three constituent communities. It has an area of 82.34 km^{2} and a population of 6,421. It is situated in the region of East Frisia. Along with the Samtgemeinde of Hesel, it is one of two in the district. It was formed in the wake of local government reform in 1973. Filsum serves as the administrative centre.

The constituent municipalities are (area in km^{2} / population):

1. Detern, Flecken (43.30 / 2,621)
2. Filsum (23.76 / 2,131)
3. Nortmoor (15.28 / 1,669)

Due to its location on the rivers Jümme and Leda, Jümme is also known as Zweistromland ("Two Rivers Land"). The East Frisian geographer, Dodo Wildvang, coined the term "East Frisian Zweistromland" in the 1920s. On the rivers are the Pünte at Wiltshausen, the oldest, operational, hand-worked ferry in Central Europe, and Germany's smallest road bridge in the district of Amdorf.

The Samtgemeinde has historical significance because of the Battle of Detern where, in 1426, the East Frisian chieftain, Focko Ukena, defeated his adversary, Ocko II tom Brok and his allies. For around 3 centuries, Stickhausen Castle in the eponymous village was also an important border fortification for the County of East Frisia. The cultural heritage of the Samtgemeinde includes the remains of the castle as well as historic churches, of which Filsum's 13th century church of St. Paul's is the oldest.

Even in comparison with the rest of inner East Frisia, the Samtgemeinde is only sparsely populated. It is dominated by dairy farming, especially on the grassy plains along the rivers. Tourism is of some importance, among the municipalities of the county, Leer is in third place for the number of overnight stays, behind Borkum and the county town. Jümme has hardly any industry; rather it is a commuter residential area, especially for its neighbouring county town.

== Geography ==
=== Location and extent ===
The Samtgemeinde of Jümme is located in the eastern part of the county of Leer in East Frisia, in the northwest of the German state of Lower Saxony. Its main settlement, Filsum, is situated about ten kilometres from the centre of the county town of Leer. The nearest city is Oldenburg, located about 42 km as the crow flies from Filsum. Further large, nearby towns are Emden (about 30 kilometres) and Aurich (nearly 27 kilometres).

With 6,453 inhabitants, spread over 82.34 square kilometres, the Samtgemeinde of Jümme is sparsely populated, its average population density being each about 78 people per square kilometre. Thus the municipality is well below the East Frisian average of 148 inhabitants per square kilometre which, in turn, is well below Lower Saxony (168) and Germany as a whole (230). At around 6,500 inhabitants, the municipality (compared to other collective and independent municipalities) is not one of the most populous municipalities in East Frisia. The regional planning programme for the county of Leer has made Filsum the lower level administrative centre for Samtgemeinde.

Detern has the greatest area of the three communities that make up the Samtgemeinde. With an area of 43.3 square kilometres, it is the second largest after of the six East Frisian Samtgemeinden after Hesel.

=== Geology and soils ===
Geologically, the surface of the Samtgemeinde of Jümme, like the whole of East Frisia, is formed from Pleistocene and Holocene beds. Pleistocene strata can be found in the geest areas, which account for the bulk of the territory of the collective municipality. In places, peat soils of the Holocene lie on top of the geest beds. The soils of the East Frisian Geest are largely made up of surface sands and boulder clay cover.

Along the Leda and the Jümme the land consists of river marshes, which are formed from silty clays. In the transition area between the rivers and the geest are peaty marshes that consist mostly of clay less than 40 centimetres thick on peat soils. The central part of the area between the Leda and the Jümme now consists of fully cultivated fen (Niedermoor). North and east of this area, in the municipalities of Nortmoor, Filsum, Detern and Stickhausen podsol soils predominate, usually in wet locations. They are mostly on hardpan but their yield has been improved by the use of plaggen over the centuries. The use of plaggen fertilisation for centuries until the emergence of artificial fertilizer in the late 19th century, has resulted in the formation of plaggen soils, especially around the villages. Because of the constant addition of fresh soil, the Esch, called Gaste in East Frisia, lies at a higher level than the village centres. The soil value is significantly increased by this form of fertiliser, although it is still clearly less than that of the fertile soils of the marshes. In places, the podsols of Anmoor have been intermingled or were turned into areas with very humus-rich topsoil as a result of peat extraction and subsequent cultivation. Along the stream of Holtslander Ehetief and the South Georgsfehn Canal are strips of fen.

=== Waterways ===
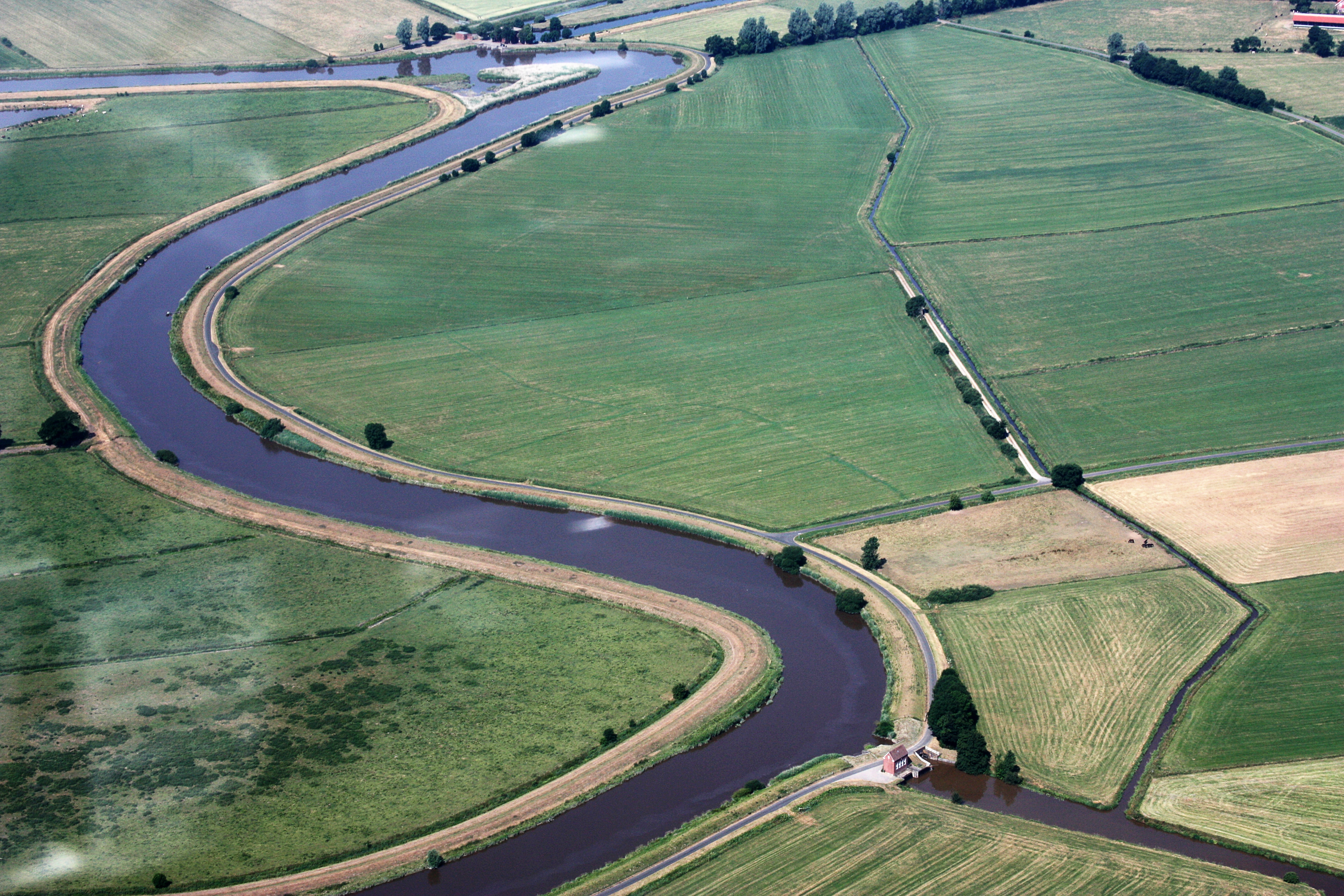
Aerial view of the Jümme

Five and a half percent of the area of the Samtgemeinde is covered in water. In Jümme there are more than 150 km of rivers and streams; in addition there are lakes, bog kolks and oxbow lakes. The most important river is the Jümme, which gives the Samtgemeinde its name. On the border to the town of Leer, the Jümme flows into the Leda, which has flowed down from the Amdorf district. A few kilometres above the Samtgemeinde area and further upstream the river flows just south of the border of the Samtgemeinde. The Leda is classified as an inland waterway in the Samtgemeinde. [5] The geography of the rivers of the area lead the East Frisian geographer Dodo Wildvang, in the 1920s, to use the term "East Frisian Mesopotamia" to describe the area of today's integrated municipality. The integrated municipality still likes to call itself "Mesopotamia".

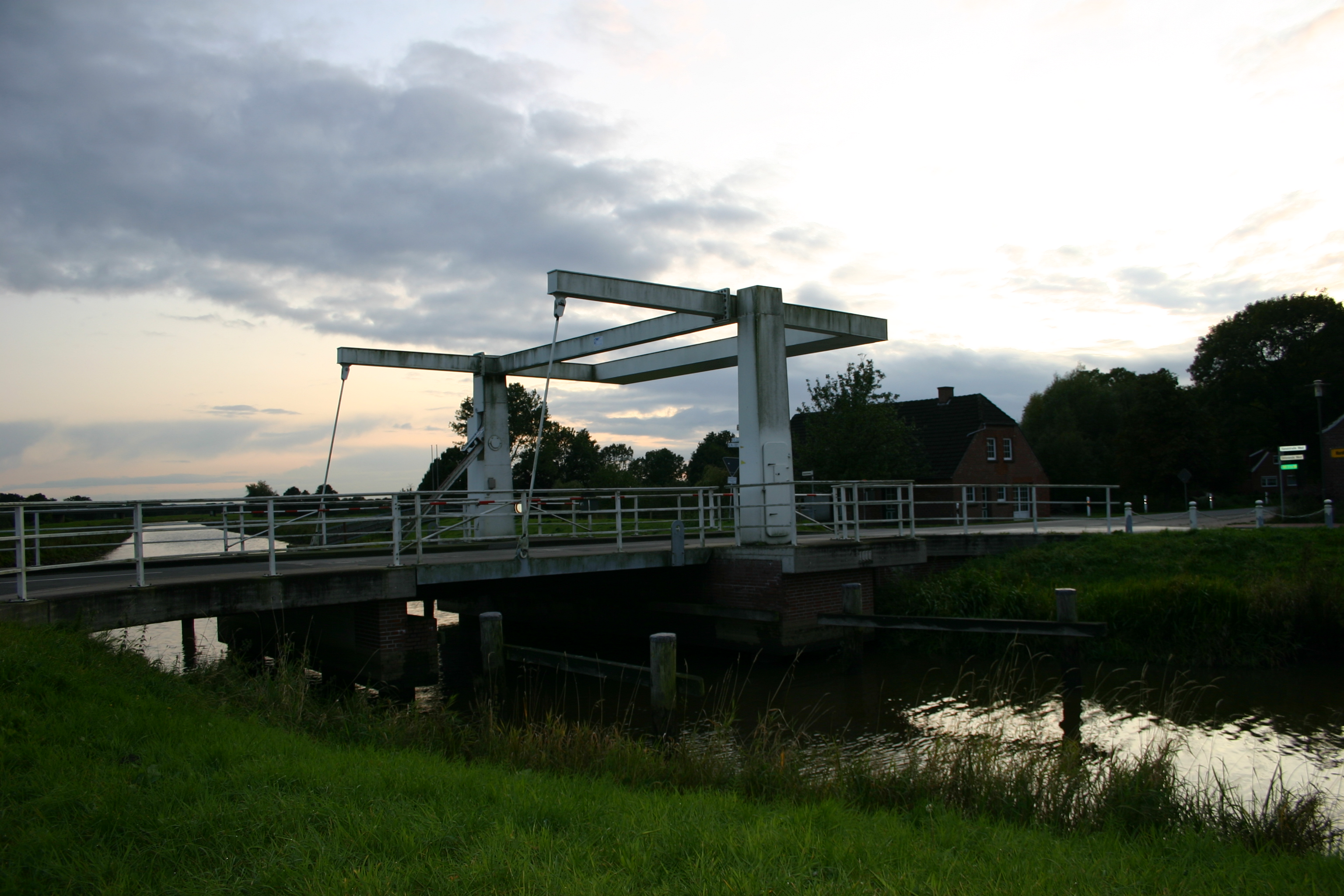
Bascule bridge spanning the North Georgsfehn Canal at Brückenfehn: the bridge was built in 2000 to replace an earlier one, and allows the rapid passage of boats.

If the Leda Sluice in Leer isn't closed - which occurs in severe storm surges - the tidal influence on the Ems can be felt far inland. The mean tidal range at the Leda Sluice is three metres. It is still 80 centimeters on the Drey Drain, a cross-connection between Leda and Jümme in the district Barge in southeastern Samtgemeinde territory.[7] Flood control, dyke safety and drainage are the responsibility of the Leda-Jümme association, which is based in Leer. Apart from the dikes and the sluices, the Association has five large controlled-discharge polders, essentially storm water overflow ponds. These are flooded when the Leda barrage must remain closed due to storm surges, but there are large water volumes coming down the Leda and Jümme (e.g. because of heavy rain or melting snow inland). One of the five discharge polders is located south of Detern and has a volume of three million cubic metres. In these polders, the water is "cached" until the sluice at Leer can be reopened. [8]

In addition to the natural waterways Leda and Jümme, there are also artificial waterways throughout the Samtgemeinde, especially the numerous small ditches draining agricultural fields. In East Frisian, these are called Schloots, a usage roughly equivalent to the East Anglian "drain" or "lode". In addition, the South- and the Nordgeorgs Fen Canals are drains of the two fens of the same name. The Nordgeorgs Fen Canal was created after the drainage of the fens in 1829 and completed in the 1920s. Since then it has connected the Ems, Leda and Jümme to the Ems-Jade Canal at Marcardsmoor. The channel played an important role in the development of the city of Wiesmoor, and is still important for the drainage of the central East Frisia. Through the Nordgeorgs Fen Canal, water levels between the Ems-Jade Canal and the Jümme can be equalized. In addition, the Nordgeorgs Fen Canal is used for waterborne tourism.

=== Land use ===
Table I: Land use
Use	Area in ha
Residential and mixed areas	264
Industrial areas	75
Road, rail and air transport areas	488
Waterways and waterbodies	449
Agricultural area	6702
Forestry area	68
sonstige Flächen	188
Total area	8234

The land use table on the right clearly shows the extremely high proportion of agricultural land as a proportion of the total land area of the Samtgemeinde. It is about 81.4 percent (compared with East Frisia at around 75 percent; Germany 52.3 percent.) The Samtgemeinde, characterised by grassy lowlands, has a very low proportion of forest, just 0.83 per cent (cf. 2.6% in East Frisia; 30.1% in Germany).

=== Neighbouring communities ===
Jümme borders on several other Samtgemeinden in the county of Leer, but is also one of the few municipalities in East Frisia that borders on the municipalities of two neighbouring counties at the same time. East of Jümme is the municipality of Apen in the county of Ammerland. To the southeast Jümme borders on the municipality of Barßel in the county of Cloppenburg. The remaining municipalities that border on Jümme are in the county of Leer. They are (clockwise) Ostrhauderfehn to the south, Rhauderfehn to the southwest, the county town of Leer to the west, the collective municipality of Hesel to the northwest and north (including Brinkum, Holtland and Hesel) and the municipality of Uplengen to the northeast.

=== Climate ===
Jümme lies in the temperate climatic zone, moderated by the influence of the North Sea. In summer, the daytime temperatures are lower, often higher in winter than further inland. Its climate is dominated by Central European westerlies.

Weather data is shown for the immediately adjacent town of Leer, which has very similar climatic conditions: the average annual temperature there is 9 °C, with average highs in the months of July and August of around 20 °C and average lows around -2 °C in December and January. The average rainfall is 738 mm/year. The months with the most rainy days are November and December, each with 14, the months with the fewest are March and May, when precipitation falls on an average of nine days. The average annual sunshine is 1,550–1,600 hours, with the average number of hours of sunshine per day varying between one (December/January) and six hours (May/June). The average frost-free period is given as 170–187 days.

Climate data for Leer
Month	Jan	Feb	Mar	Apr	May	Jun	Jul	Aug	Sep	Oct	Nov	Dec	Year
Mean daily maximum °F	39	41	46	54	63	68	70	70	64	57	46	41	55
Mean daily minimum °F	28	30	34	37	43	48	52	52	48	43	36	32	40
Average precipitation inches	2.33	1.58	2.02	1.81	2.42	3.05	2.94	2.65	2.58	2.46	2.72	2.49	29.05
Mean daily maximum °C	4	5	8	12	17	20	21	21	18	14	8	5	13
Mean daily minimum °C	−2	−1	1	3	6	9	11	11	9	6	2	0	5
Average precipitation mm	59.2	40.1	51.4	46.0	61.5	77.4	74.8	67.2	65.6	62.5	69.1	63.2	738
Average precipitation days	13	9	12	10	11	11	11	11	11	11	14	14	138
Mean daily sunshine hours	1	2	3	5	6	6	6	6	4	3	2	1	4
Source: ,

=== Protected areas ===
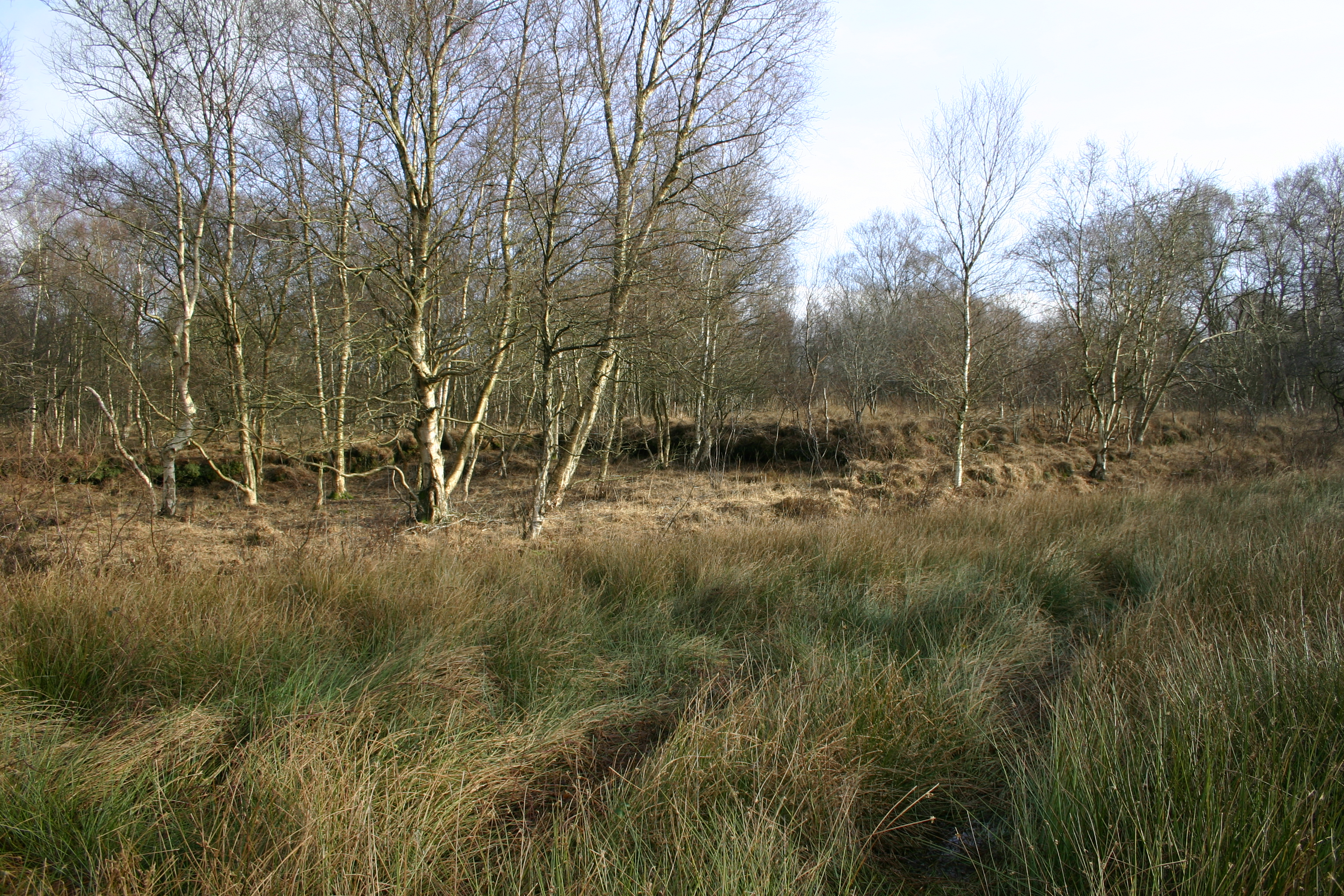
Bog and heath vegetation in the protected area of Filsumer Moor

Since 1941, there has been a nature reserve in Jümme: the Barger Meer by the village after which it is named. Its area is 6.3 hectares and it is almost all part of the eponymous FFH area. The 45.5 hectare protected area of Filsumer Moor was established in 1975. It is a former bog between the villages of Stallbrüggerfeld, Busboomsfehn and Brückenfehn. There are also several natural monuments in the form of ancient trees in Nortmoor, Stickhausen and Detern.

== History ==
=== Prehistory and Early History ===
The northwestern part of the integrated municipality region belonged to the Oldenburg-East Frisian Geest ridge, on which the previously "oldest archaeological discovery" was found: an approximately 35,000- to 40,000-year-old, twelve centimetres long and nine centimetres wide flint device as a tool for cutting and scraping from the Middle Palaeolithic . [16] The find was made in the immediate northern Holtland. The oldest traces of human settlement were found in the districts of Filsum Nortmoor and date from the Neolithic period, both from the Funnel Beaker culture as well as from the single grave culture. A number of other finds are from the Bronze Age. A pair of tweezers and a razor made of bronze, a semicircle scraper made of flint and a double-leaf arrowhead from dentin were discovered around the graves.

=== Middle Ages ===
In the late Middle Ages Jümme belonged to Frisian country municipality Moormerland. (Not to be confused with the modern German municipality of the same name.)

=== Chieftain era (14th and 15th centuries) ===
The consular constitution of the Frisian freedom existed until about the middle of the 14th century. It then collapsed and was gradually replaced, as powerful families took over the region. The area thus came under the influence of the chief Focko Ukena from Neermoor.

In the later conflict between Ukena and Freiheitsbund, this area was on the side of the Neermoorer or Leeraner chief.

Stickhausen Castle was built around 1435 near the city of Hamburg. The Hamburger gave the castle to the chief and later Counts (since 1464). Ulrich I, ordered the expansion of the castle as a border fortification against the county Oldenburg. The castle secured the Oldenburg from Apen and Stickhausen.

=== Under the Cirksenas (1464-1744) ===
Much of the area was part of an important strategic location during the Thirty Years War. It changed hands three times over the course of the conflict.

=== Prussian period (1744-1806/15) ===
In 1744, East Frisia fell to Prussia. During this time, the population steadily increased, and developed stable agricultural systems until it was absorbed into the Kingdom of Hanover in 1815.

=== Kingdom of Hanover and German Empire (1815-1918) ===
The area belonged to the Kingdom of Hanover for 51 years (1815-1866).

In Prussia there was 1885 a territorial reform, in which the old offices were resolved in favor of newly created district, as well as in East Frisia. The district of Leer was created from the previous offices of Leerort Stickhausen. For the county sea, the town of Leer was chosen.

=== Weimar Republic and Nazi era ===
The villages Amdorf and Neuburg were early strongholds of the NSDAP. At the county council election on 17 November 1929, the Nazis had two of their best results in the district of Leer with 51 and 53.7 percent. [34] By comparison, county wide, the National Socialists received 52.1 percent of the vote [35]

The takeover by the National Socialists initially focused on the East Frisian cities. However, the Leer District representative Hermann Conring retained many of his functions.

During the war, the area was not affected by airstrikes. Allied troops invaded on 28 / 29 April 1945. Leer was conquered, and they subsequently moved further east in to the area of today's integrated municipality.
