= Stickhausen Castle =

- Burg Stickhausen
- Detern-Stickhausen
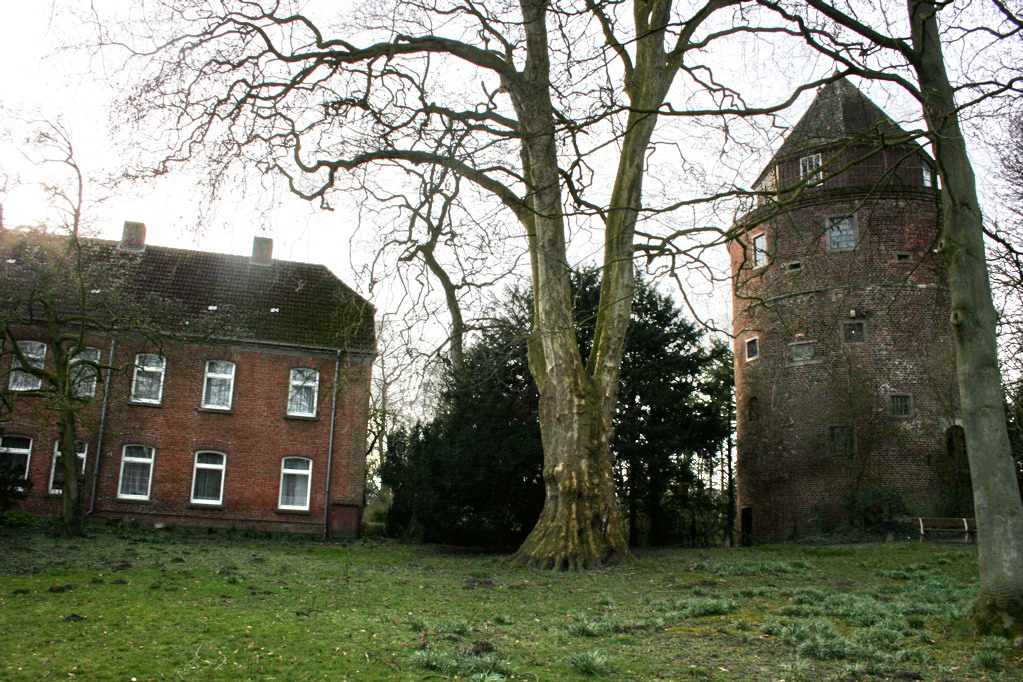
- Stickhausen Castle

Site information
- Type: Concentric castle
- Open to the public: yes

Location
- Stickhausen Castle shown within Lower Saxony, Germany
- Coordinates: 53.218012°N 7.643212°E

Site history
- Built: c. 1345

Stickhausen Castle is located on the western edge of the village Stickhausen, a district of the East Frisian municipality Detern in the Landkreis of Leer in Lower Saxony.

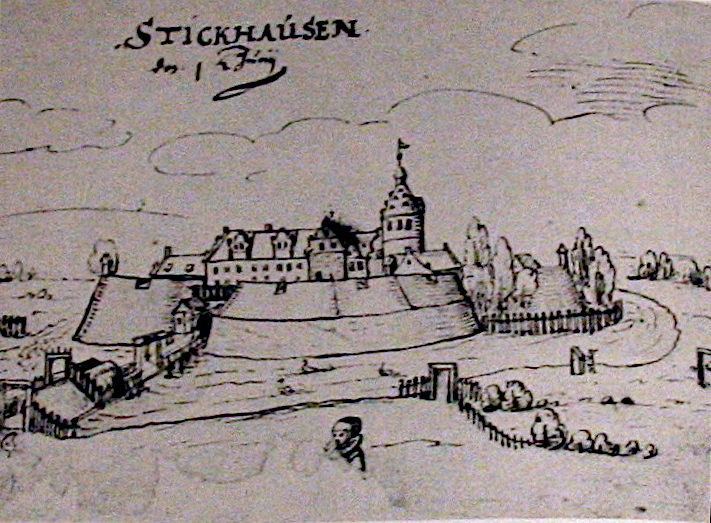
Stickhausen Castle in 1632

== Location ==
The castle is situated on the banks of the Jümme. This river, together with the nearby Leda forms the so-called East Frisian Mesopotamia, the Leda-Jümme area. Both rivers were important trade routes in the Middle Ages and early modern times, because they flowed in an east-west direction.

== Name ==
The name of the castle as well as the village is composed of the words Sticke (stick, pole) and Hause (house) and means a house fortified with palisades.

== History ==
Unlike the other castles of East Friesia, Stickhausen Castle was never the seat of the East Frisian chieftains. It was built around 1345 by the city of Hamburg to protect their westbound trade routes. After intense debate, the Hamburg pledged them in about 1453 to the chieftain and later to Count Ulrich I of East Frisia. This castle was built as the replacement for the older border fortress Schlüsselburg in Detern. This fortress had been part of a border defense line against the adjacent County of Oldenburg and secured access to East Frisia. After the Schlüsselburg fortress had been destroyed and rebuilt several times, it lost its importance after the construction of Stickhausen Castle and is no longer mentioned in documents.

Stickhausen Castle initially consisted of a stone house surrounded by a moat. In addition, it had a gatehouse and a bailey with farm buildings. A second wall and a second trench surrounded and protected the entire complex.

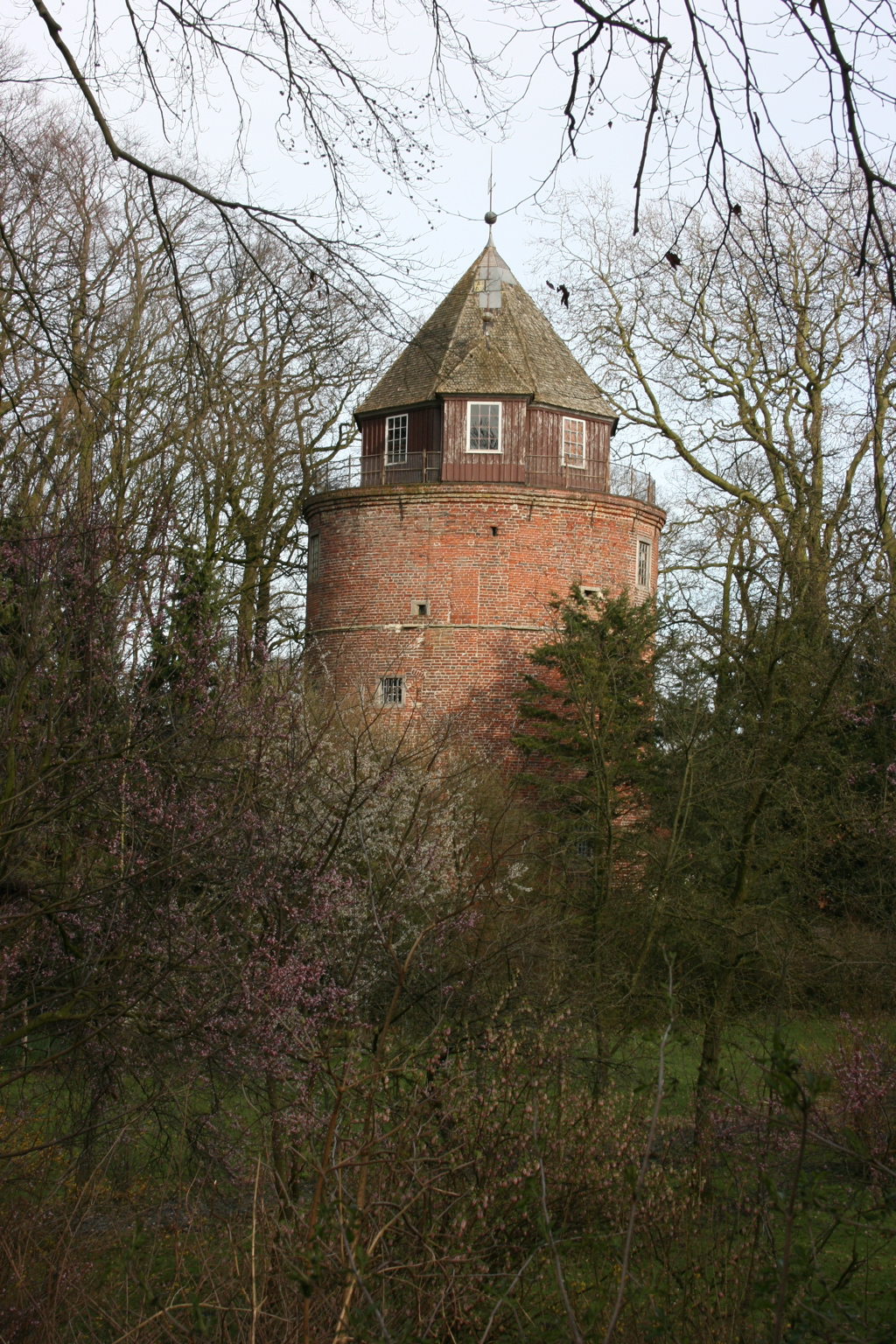
Round Tower

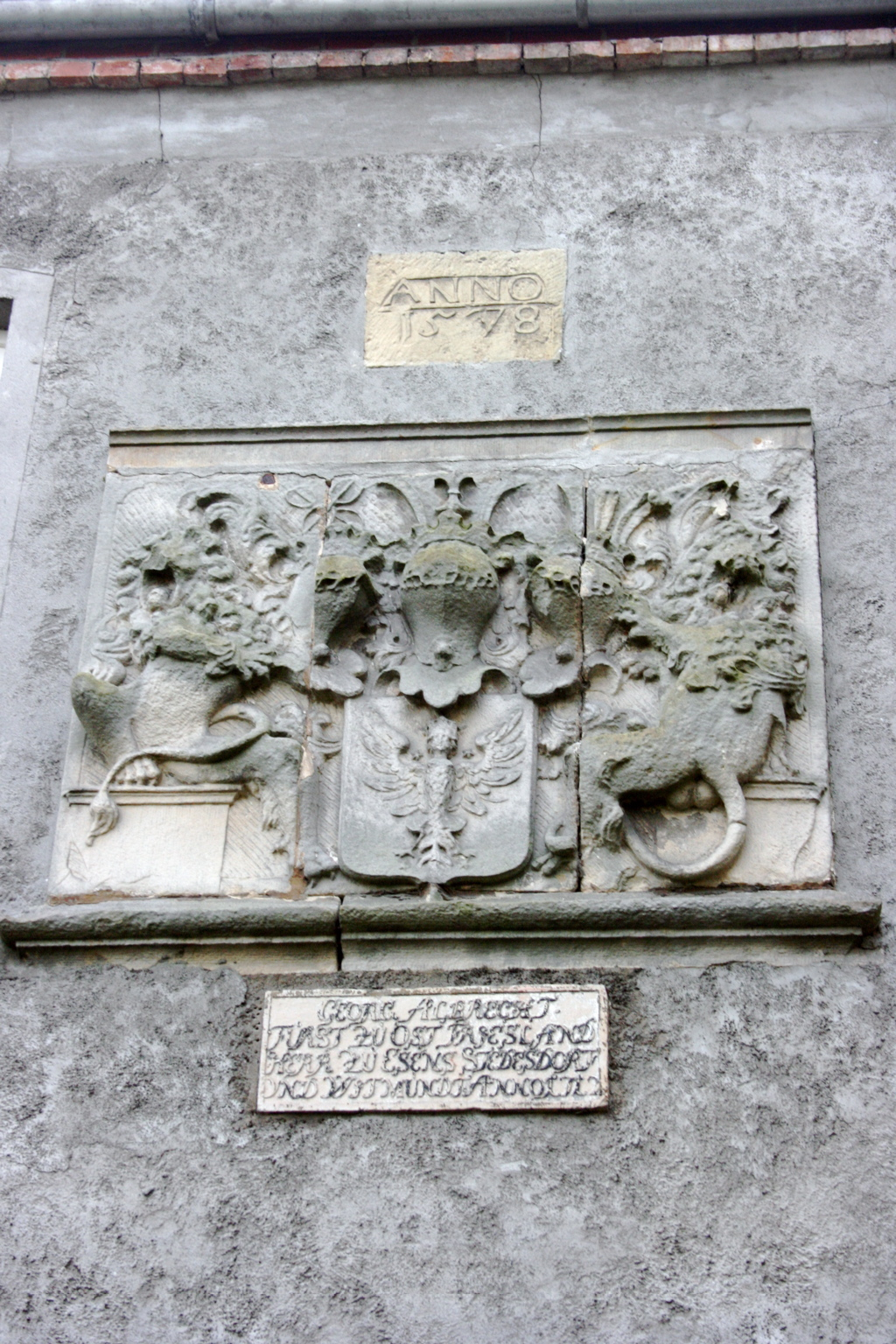
Coat of arms in the former gatehouse

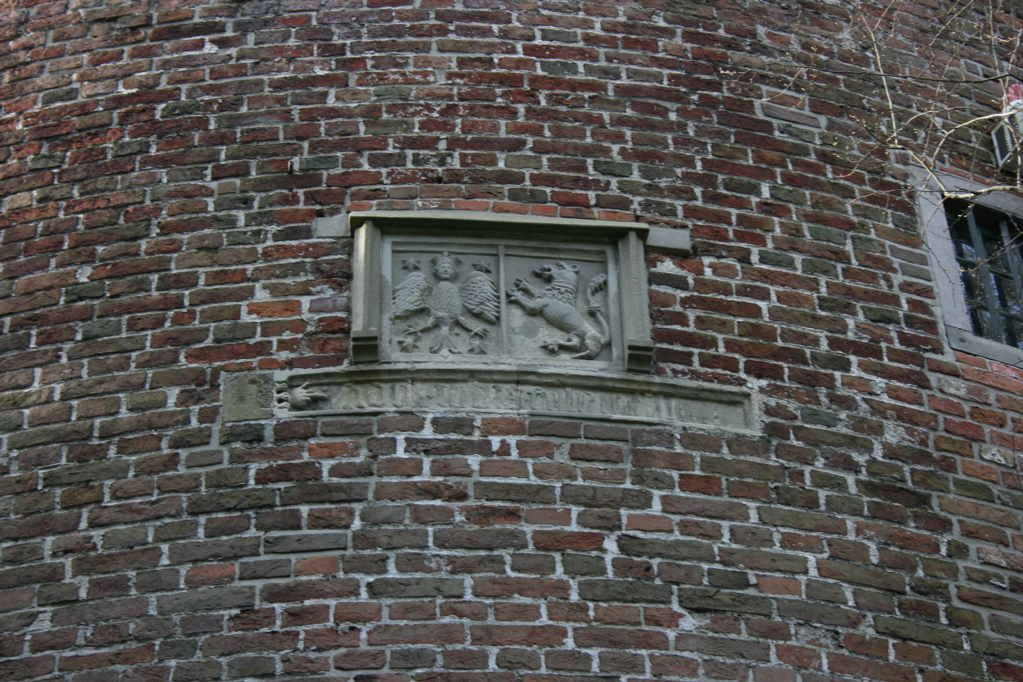
Coat of arms on the round tower

Count Edzard I added the round tower around 1498. It still exists. Edzards participation in the Saxon feud led to a siege of the castle by a coalition of princes led by George, Duke of Saxony. The caste was conquered and occupied by the coalition for three years.

After the Reformation, Countess Anna built an outer wall in 1558 using stones from the abandoned Barthe Abbey and from Uplengen Castle, which had been razed in 1535 at the behest of Count Enno II. The castle was further extended by Count Johan II, who died at the castle in 1591.

During the Thirty Years' War, the castle was fought over several times. In the years 1622 to 1624, the dreaded mercenary troops of the Ernst von Mansfeld occupied the castle. They reinforced the castle by constructing several outworks. After von Mansfeld's troops withdrew, the counts of East Frisia held the castle for a short period, until it was occupied by Hessian troops from 1637 to 1640. They completed the expansion of the fortress by building a fortified substation as a complement to the existing ravelin and the actual castle. The entire complex comprised at that time a three-winged main castle with corner tower, the old bailey to the gatehouse, stables, peat barn, burgrave's mansion and garrison church on the upper floor of the gatehouse, outer wall with powder tower and a ravelin on the south side, between the Jümme and the main complex. On the east side was the new substation, consisting of barracks, houses and farm buildings. In total, there were four batteries, four in the main castle and one in the substation.

After Prussia gained control of East Frisia in 1744, the castle no longer served any purpose and Frederick the Great ordered it razed. Today only the large round tower from 1498 remains and traces of the fortifications. In 1822, the gatehouse was extended and converted into the bailiff's office. On the outside wall of this building, a coat of arms dating from 1578 can be seen. The round tower was used as a prison, as well as the bailiff's residence. The former substation evolved into the village of Stickhausen. In 1885, the castle came into private hands. During the Second World War, the tower was damaged by artillery fire. In 1951, the first measures were taken to preserve the tower. Today the tower is a heritage and folk art museum. On the ground floor are the prison cells with instruments of torture such as the rack and clamps. On the first floor of the living conditions of the prison guard are shown, while the second floor is devoted to the history of the castle. In the attic, finally, a bird and bird egg collection are on display.
