= Aper Tief =

River in Lower Saxony, Germany

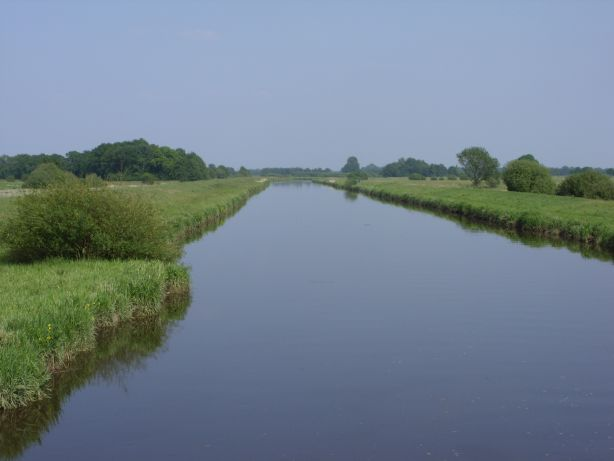
- The Aper Tief (near Holtgast)

- Location of mouth in Lower Saxony

Location
- Country: Germany
- State: Lower Saxony
- Districts: Ammerland and Leer
- Reference no.: DE: 3884

Physical characteristics
- Source
  - location: Source: Confluence of the Großer Süderbäke and Großer Norderbäke
  - coordinates: 53°13′03″N 7°47′34″E
  - elevation: 2 m above sea level (NN)
- Mouth
  - location: south of Detern into the Jümme
  - coordinates: 53°12′19″N 7°40′40″E
- Length: 31.4 km (19.5 mi)
- Basin size: 276 km^{2} (107 sq mi)

Basin features
- Progression: Jümme→ Leda→ Ems→ North Sea
- Landmarks: Small towns: Apen, Augustfehn, Detern; Villages: Apen, Samtgemeinde Jümme
- Tributaries
  - left: Nordenloher Canal
  - right: Große Norderbäke, Hengstforder Hauptpumpgraben

The Aper Tief is a stream in Lower Saxony, Germany.

It flows through the municipalities of Apen (district of Ammerland) and Detern in the collective municipality of Jümme (district of Leer). It begins west of Apen at the confluence of the Große Süderbäke and the Große Norderbäke, runs roughly east–west and empties south of the municipality of Detern into the Jümme. Including its source river Große Süderbäke, its total length is 31.4 km (19.5 mi). The Aper Tief is tidal. Its tidal range is about three quarters of a metre.

== See also ==
- List of rivers of Lower Saxony

== Literature ==
- Dipl.-Ing. Richard Eckhoff, Hilke Hinrichs: Das Aper Tief darf wieder das Bett verlassen. In: gewässer-info, Nr. 53, January 2012, pp. 569–571 (pdf file, 3.2 MB)
