= Schwerinsdorf =

- Municipality
- Flag Coat of arms

- Location of Schwerinsdorf within Leer district
- Interactive map of Schwerinsdorf
- Location within Germany Location within Lower Saxony
- Coordinates: 53°19′N 7°41′E
- Country: Germany
- State: Lower Saxony
- District: Leer
- Municipal assoc.: Hesel

Government
  - Mayor: Andreas Rademacher (CDU)

Area
  - Total: 5.57 km^{2} (2.15 sq mi)
- Elevation: 5 m (16 ft)

Population (2025-12-31)
  - Total: 737
  - Density: 132/km^{2} (343/sq mi)
- Time zone: UTC+01:00 (CET)
  - Summer (DST): UTC+02:00 (CEST)
- Postal codes: 26835
- Dialling codes: 0 49 56
- Vehicle registration: LER

Schwerinsdorf is a municipality in the district of Leer, in Lower Saxony, Germany. The municipality has 705 inhabitants and covers an area of 5.57 square kilometers.

== Geography ==
=== Location ===
The community is located between Hesel and Remels on the former federal highway 75 (now Landesstraße 24). Administratively Schwerinsdorf belongs to the integrated municipality Hesel in the north of the district Leer. Neighboring communities are Firrel in the north and Hesel in the west (both also belonging to the joint municipality Hesel) and Uplengen in the east.

== History ==
=== From the founding of 1802 until the end of the empire in 1918 ===
Starting point of today's community Schwerinsdorf was submitted on 15 June 1799 request of a tenant of the Dominion Gutshof Monastery Barthe in the Prussian War and Domain Chamber Aurich to lease his son a piece of bog on today's municipal area, on which he could settle. However, the first settlers built up until 1802 their modest cottage on the moor, as previously still limit stipulations with the neighboring towns Selverde, Hasselt and small Oldendorf and with the Dominialgut needed to be clarified. The new colony was named after Friedrich Carl Heinrich von Schwerin(1768-1805), President of the War and Domain Chamber in Aurich from 1798 to 1803 and 1804/05. He killed himself in Aurich in 1805. Under him, the temporarily suspended peat colonization in East Frisia had been resumed. Until then, the colony had been called "at the monastery of Barthe".

After 1815, the Kingdom of Prussia Ostfriesland ceded to the Kingdom of Hanover . Within Hanover belonged Schwerinsdorf Office Stickhausen, therein to the official votebook Remels and in turn to the subvogue Hesel. In 1848 Hesel formed an independent bailiwick within the office Stickhausen.
