= Sagter Ems =

River in Germany

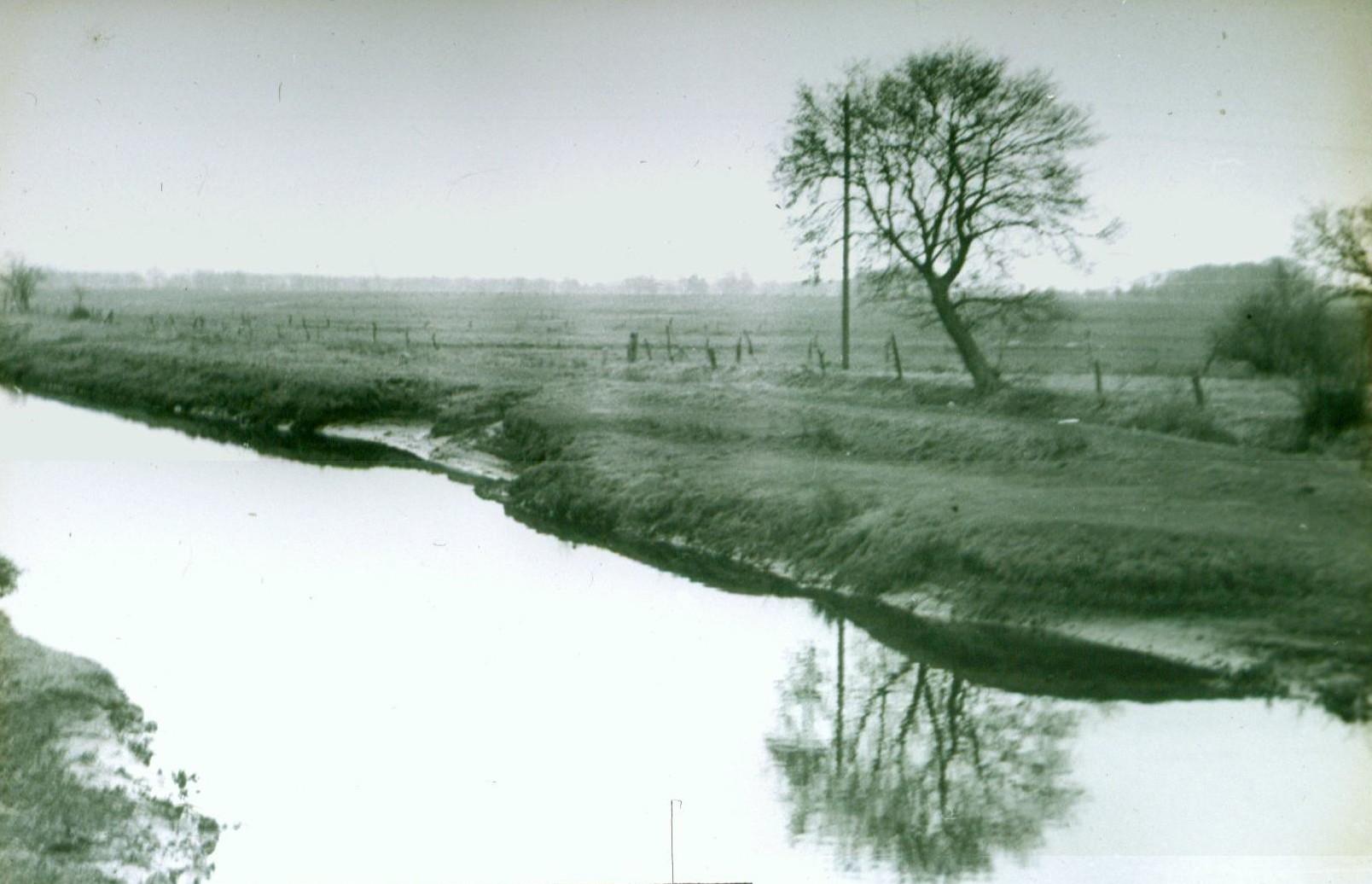
- The Sagter Ems in 1931

Location
- Country: Germany
- State: Lower Saxony

Physical characteristics
- Mouth
  - location: Leda
  - coordinates: 53.1778°N 7.6718°E

Basin features
- Progression: Leda→ Ems→ North Sea

Sagter Ems is a river of Lower Saxony, Germany. It is formed at the confluence of the rivers Ohe and Marka west of Friesoythe. It is 28 km long. At its confluence with the Dreyschloot (a branch of the Soeste), the river Leda is formed. The Sagter Ems is known as the Leda in East Frisia.

The Sagter Ems is affected by the tide along the portion of its course up to Strücklingen.

== See also ==
- List of rivers of Lower Saxony
