= Hanken =

Hanken is a surname. Notable people:

- Albert Hanken (1926–2016), Dutch mathematician
- James Hanken, American biologist and Professor of Zoology at Harvard University
- Ray Hanken (1911–1980), American football player
- Tamme Hanken (1960–2016)
- Jerome J. Hanken (1934-2009), American Chess player

Hanken School of Economics is a business school in Finland.
