= Marka (river) =

River in Germany

Location
- Country: Germany
- State: Lower Saxony

Physical characteristics
- Mouth
  - location: Sagter Ems
  - coordinates: 53.0242°N 7.7449°E
- Length: 28.7 km (17.8 mi)
- Basin size: 142 km^{2} (55 sq mi)

Basin features
- Progression: Sagter Ems→ Leda→ Ems→ North Sea

Marka is a 28.7 km (17.8 mi) long river in Lower Saxony, Germany. At its confluence with the Ohe west of Friesoythe, the river Sagter Ems is formed.

== See also ==
- List of rivers of Lower Saxony
