= Hilker =

Hilker is a surname. Notable people with the surname include:

- Edward F. Hilker (1881–1949), American politician
- Georg Hilker (1807–1875), Danish painter
- Monika Hilker (born 1959), German zoologist
- Nadia Hilker (born 1988), German actress
- Wilfried Hilker (born 1930), German football referee
