= Potshausen =

Coordinates: 53°11′N 7°37′E

Potshausen is part of Ostrhauderfehn, a municipality in Leer district, Lower Saxony, Germany.

Potshausen is famous in northern Germany for its Evangelisch Ostfriesische Landvolkshochschule. This is a school for public education, primarily for adults, but also providing a private school for those pupils who are not able to finish at public schools.
