= Anja Arndt =

German politician (born 1967)

Anja Arndt MEP
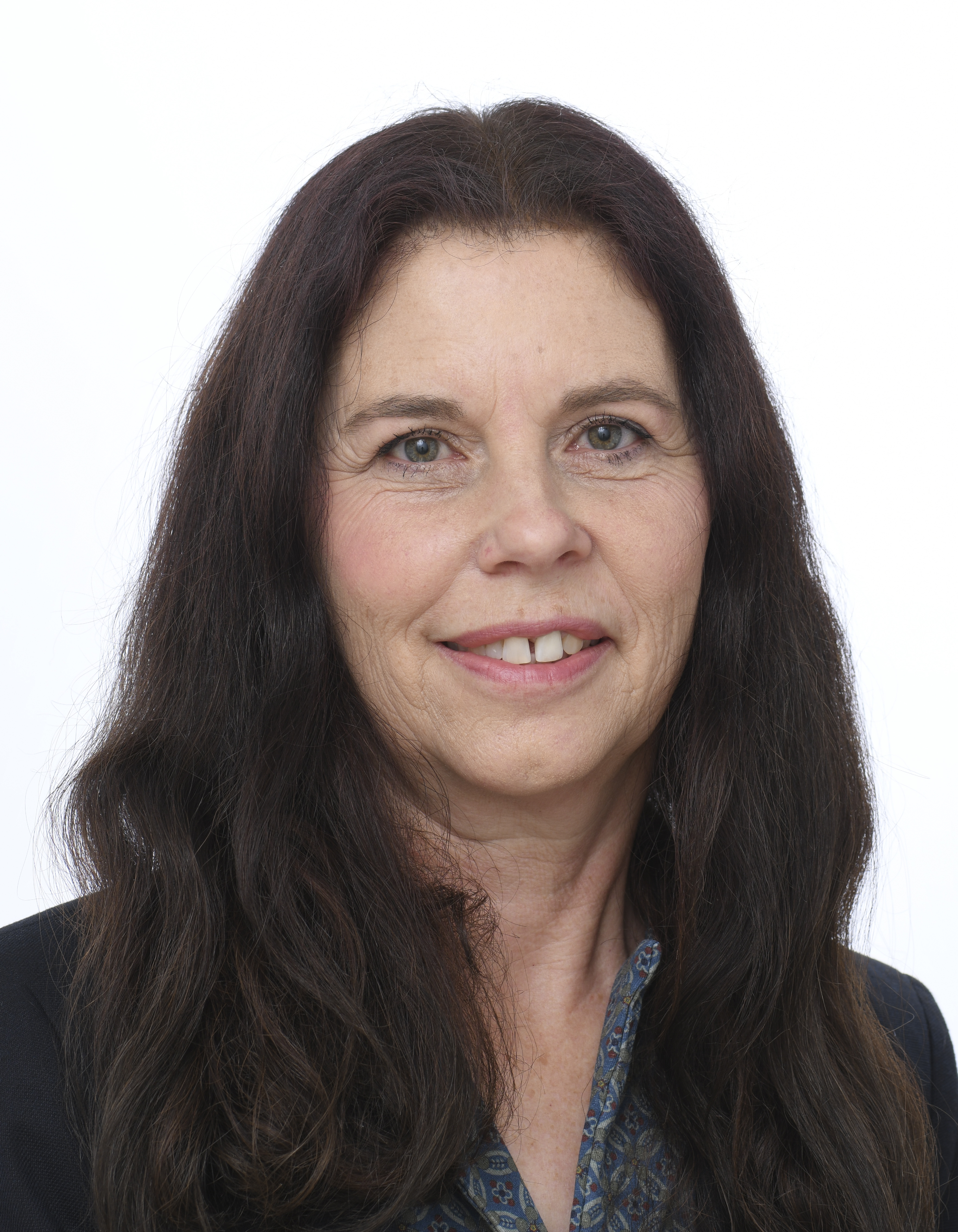
- Arndt in 2024

Member of the European Parliament for Germany
- Incumbent
- Assumed office 16 July 2024

Personal details
- Born: 10 January 1966 (age 60)
- Party: Alternative for Germany
- Other political affiliations: Europe of Sovereign Nations

Anja Regine Arndt (born 10 January 1966) is a German politician of Alternative for Germany (AfD) who was elected member of the European Parliament in 2024. She has served as chair of the Alternative for Germany in East Frisia since 2022.

== Early life ==
Arndt was born in Lower Saxony. She completed a teaching degree for upper secondary schools in politics, economics, and sports and has since then worked as a managing consultant.

== Personal life ==
Arndt resides in Nortmoor. She has been married to Arno Arndt, a politician from the East Frisian AfD, since 1985 and they have four children.
