= Ohe (Sagter Ems) =

River in Germany

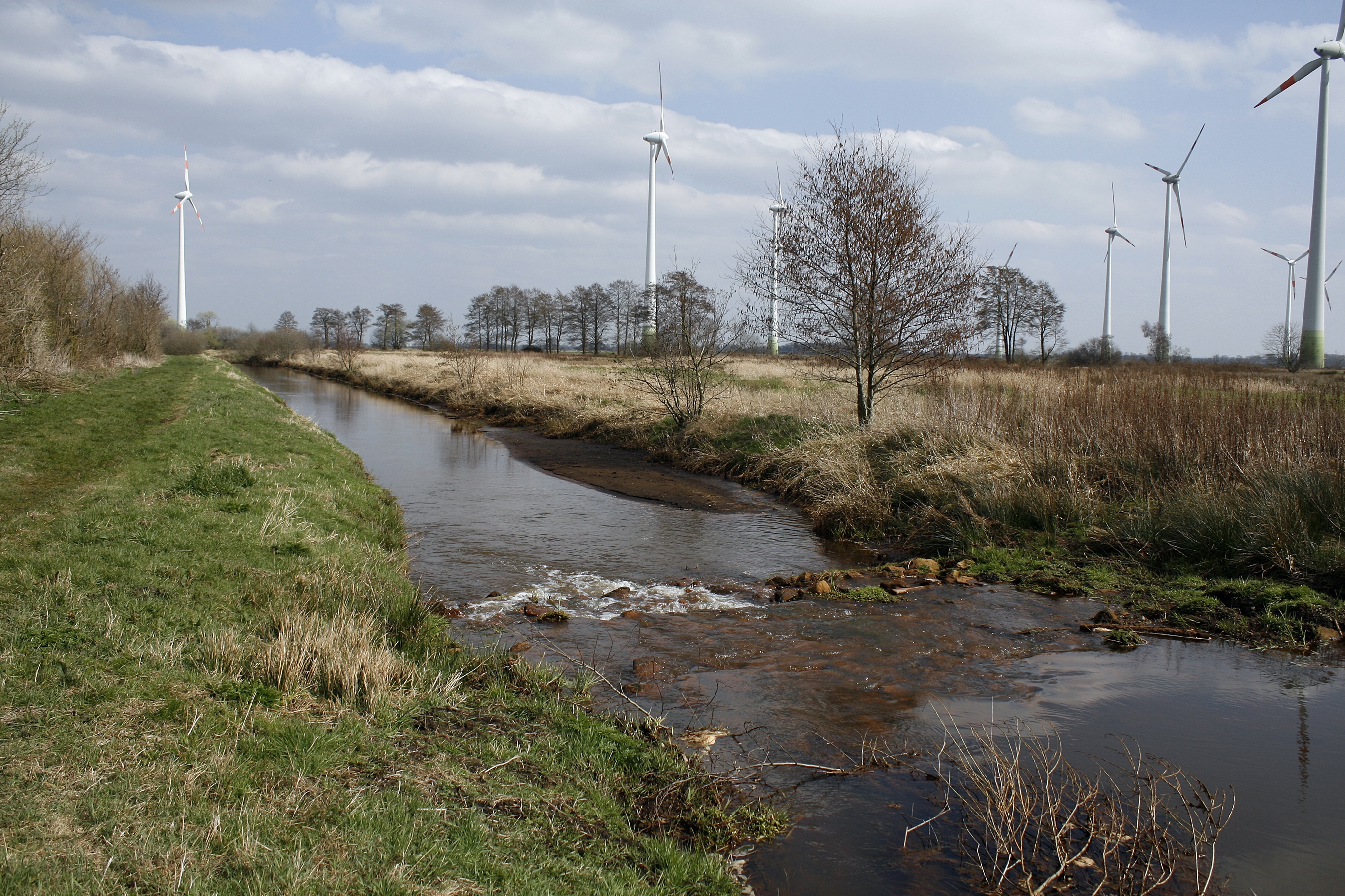

Location
- Country: Germany
- States: Lower Saxony

Physical characteristics
- Mouth
  - location: Sagter Ems
  - coordinates: 53.0242°N 7.7449°E

Basin features
- Progression: Sagter Ems→ Leda→ Ems→ North Sea

Ohe is a river of Lower Saxony, Germany. At its confluence with the Marka west of Friesoythe, the river Sagter Ems is formed.

== See also ==
- List of rivers of Lower Saxony
