= JRP =

JRP may refer to:

== Arts, media, and entertainment ==
- Journal of Research Practice, a biannual open-access academic journal

== Businesses and organizations ==
- Japan Renewal Party, a former Japanese political party
- Japan Restoration Party, a former Japanese political party
- JRP-Ringier, a Swiss publisher of books on contemporary art, formerly known as JRP Editions
- Just Group plc, a British retirement products company, formerly known as JRP Group
- James River Petroleum, a petroleum fuels company, commonly abbreviated as JRP.

== Transportation ==
- Jackie Robinson Parkway, New York City, New York, United States
- Japan Rail Pass, a Japan Railways pass for overseas visitors
