= Lukas Reinken =

German politician (born 1995)

Member of the Landtag of Lower Saxony
- Incumbent
- Assumed office 8 November 2022

Personal details
- Born: 4 December 1995 (age 30) Friesoythe
- Party: Christian Democratic Union (since 2011)

Lukas Reinken (born 4 December 1995 in Friesoythe) is a German politician serving as a member of the Landtag of Lower Saxony since 2022. He has served as chairman of the Young Union in Oldenburg Land since 2020.
