= Frisian rebellion =

Frisian rebellion may refer to the following:

- The East Frisian rebellion against the rule of the tom Brok family over East Frisia which began with the Battle of Detern in 1426
- An uprising in Friesland province from 1515 to 1523 that was staged by the Arumer Zwarte Hoop
