= Filsum =

- Municipality
- Location of Filsum within Leer district
- Interactive map of Filsum
- Location within Germany Location within Lower Saxony
- Coordinates: 53°14′N 7°38′E
- Country: Germany
- State: Lower Saxony
- District: Leer
- Municipal assoc.: Jümme

Government
  - Mayor: Georg Gathen (CDU)

Area
  - Total: 23.76 km^{2} (9.17 sq mi)

Population (2025-12-31)
  - Total: 2,215
  - Density: 93.22/km^{2} (241.4/sq mi)
- Time zone: UTC+01:00 (CET)
  - Summer (DST): UTC+02:00 (CEST)
- Postal codes: 26849
- Dialling codes: 04957
- Vehicle registration: LER
- Website: filsum.de

Filsum is a small municipality in the Leer district, in the North West of Germany.

The municipality lies approximately 30 km from the Netherlands border, and 50 km from where the coast meets the North Sea.

It is home to the 'horse whisperer' and bonesetter, Tamme Hanken.

== Mayors ==
Gerhard Bruns (CDU) was elected in 2016 honorary mayor of Filsum. He ist the successor of Margret Schulte-Cramer (CDU), she was in office 2011-2016.
