= Firrel =

- Municipality
- Location of Firrel within Leer district
- Interactive map of Firrel
- Location within Germany Location within Lower Saxony
- Coordinates: 53°20′N 7°40′E
- Country: Germany
- State: Lower Saxony
- District: Leer
- Municipal assoc.: Hesel

Government
  - Mayor: Heinrich Hagedorn (CDU)

Area
  - Total: 8.26 km^{2} (3.19 sq mi)
- Elevation: 6 m (20 ft)

Population (2025-12-31)
  - Total: 802
  - Density: 97.1/km^{2} (251/sq mi)
- Time zone: UTC+01:00 (CET)
  - Summer (DST): UTC+02:00 (CEST)
- Postal codes: 26835
- Dialling codes: 0 49 46
- Vehicle registration: LER

Firrel is a municipality in the district of Leer, in Lower Saxony, Germany.
