= Remelsbach =

River in Germany

Location
- Country: Germany
- States: North Rhine-Westphalia

Physical characteristics
- Mouth
  - location: Möhne
  - coordinates: 51.4866°N 8.3005°E

Basin features
- Progression: Möhne→ Ruhr→ Rhine→ North Sea

Remelsbach is a small river of North Rhine-Westphalia, Germany. It is 1.8 km (1.1 mi) long and flows as a right tributary into the Möhne near Belecke.

== See also ==
- List of rivers of North Rhine-Westphalia
