= Hesel (Samtgemeinde) =

- Samtgemeinde
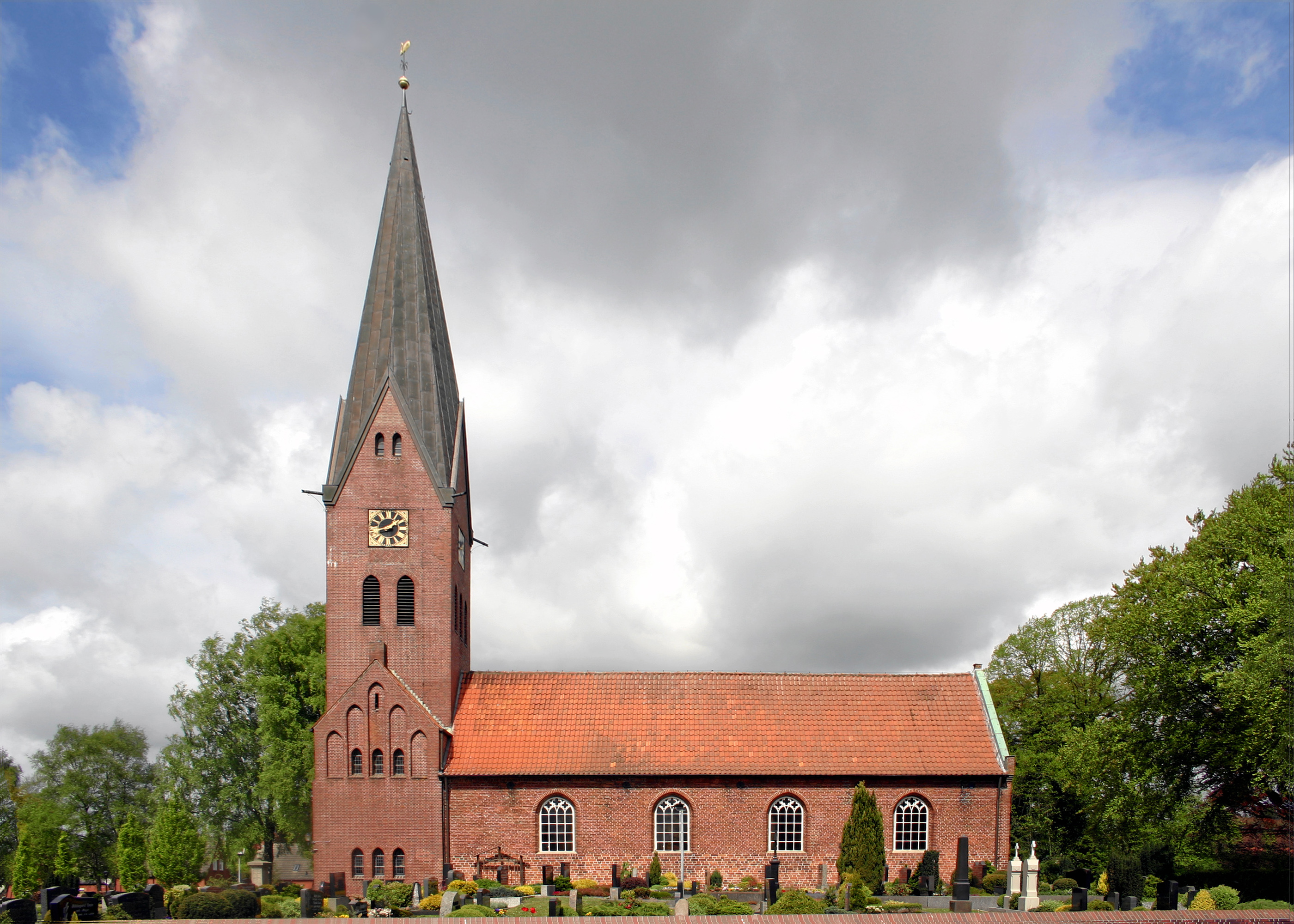
- Historic Liudger Church in Hesel

- Coat of arms

- Location of Hesel within Leer district
- Interactive map of Hesel
- Location within Germany Location within Lower Saxony
- Coordinates: 53°18′N 7°36′E
- Country: Germany
- State: Lower Saxony
- District: Leer
- Seat: Hesel
- Subdivisions: 6 municipalities

Area
  - Total: 84.33 km^{2} (32.56 sq mi)

Population (2025-12-31)
  - Total: 11,083
  - Density: 131.4/km^{2} (340.4/sq mi)
- Time zone: UTC+01:00 (CET)
  - Summer (DST): UTC+02:00 (CEST)
- Website: www.hesel.de

Hesel is a Samtgemeinde ("joint municipality") in the district of Leer, in Lower Saxony, Germany. Its seat is in the village Hesel.

The Samtgemeinde Hesel consists of the following municipalities:

1. Brinkum
2. Firrel
3. Hesel
4. Holtland
5. Neukamperfehn
6. Schwerinsdorf

The area lies centrally within the Oldenburg-East Frisian geest ridge. Already in prehistoric and early historic times Hesel was the junction of a road network. It still has this function today in the modern road network of East Frisia. On the territory of the joint municipality there are many of the oldest traces of human settlement of East Frisia. Favoured by its location, the main village of Hesel was the site of two monasteries and several monastery outworks in the High and Late Middle Ages. On January 17, 1972, the six communities mentioned above merged to form the joint municipality of Hesel.

Economically, the joint municipality of Hesel is primarily characterized by medium-sized businesses. Agriculture has always played a major role in the joint municipality, as can be seen from the high proportion of agricultural land of more than 75 percent. Tourism plays a role to a certain extent. However, the joint municipality as a whole is a commuter area, especially to the neighboring county seat of Leer.

The cultural heritage of the joint municipality includes the 13th century Marienkirche (St. Mary's Church) in Holtland, the former monastery outworks Gut Stikelkamp from the 16th century and several archaeological sites.
