= Tamme Hanken =

German horse trainer

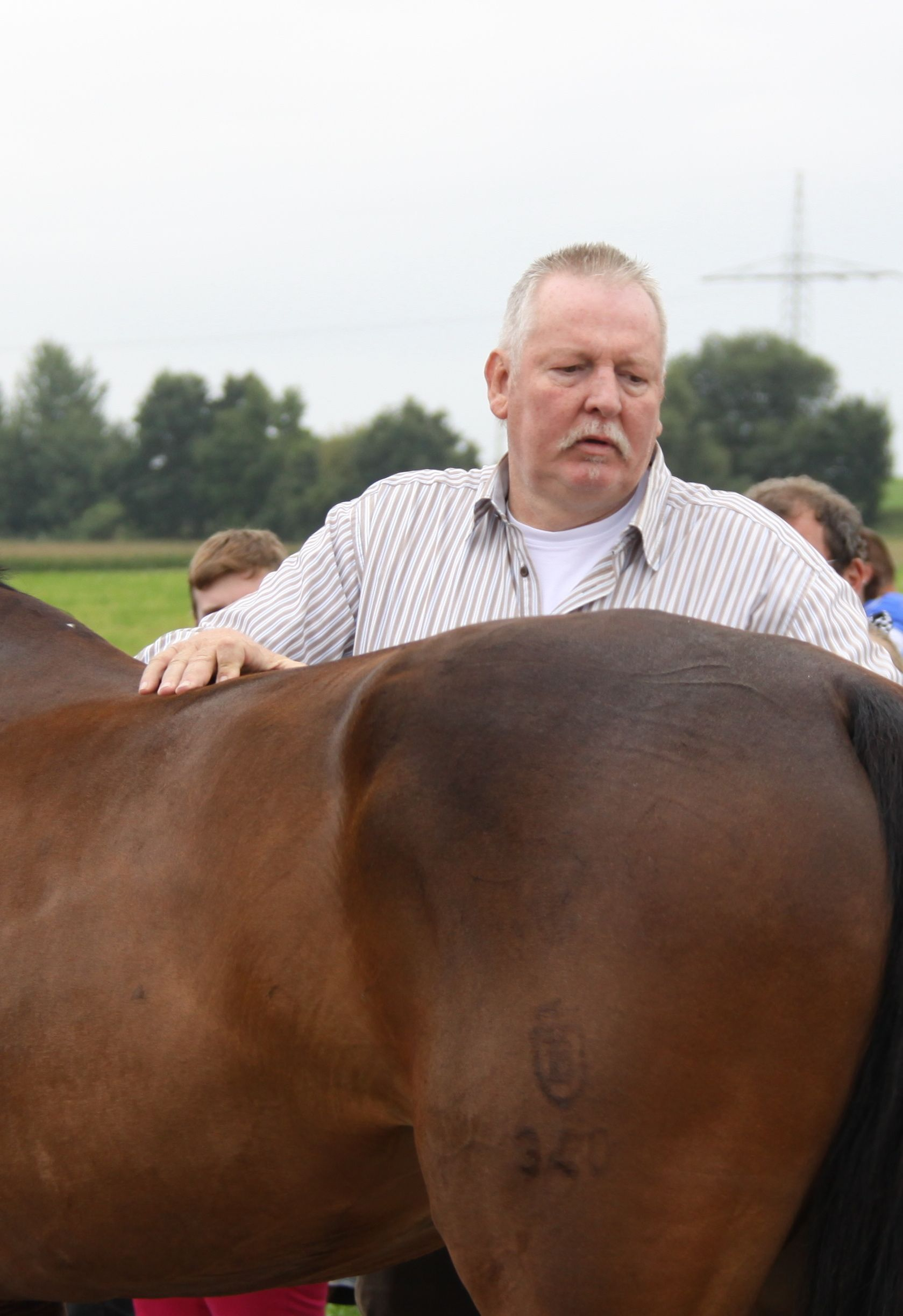
- Tamme Hanken 2014
- Born: May 16, 1960; Filsum, West Germany
- Died: 10 October 2016 (aged 56); Garmisch-Partenkirchen, Germany
- Occupation: Horse trainer
- Spouse: Carmen Hanken

Tamme Hanken (May 16, 1960 – October 10, 2016) was a German horse whisperer and animals bonesetter known from the two documentary TV shows Der XXL-Ostfriese on NDR and Knochenbrecher on Tour on kabel eins, the latter of which had up to two million viewers. Born in Filsum, he also was the author of a book, Das Glück der Pferde in meinen Händen, which was published in 2001.

Tamme Hanken, who didn't have any formal chiropractic education, died in Garmisch-Partenkirchen on October 10, 2016, from sudden heart failure. 2.06 m (6 ft 9 in) tall and weighing 140 kg (310 lb), he was described as a "gentle giant" by an NDR obituary.
