= Soeste =

River in Germany

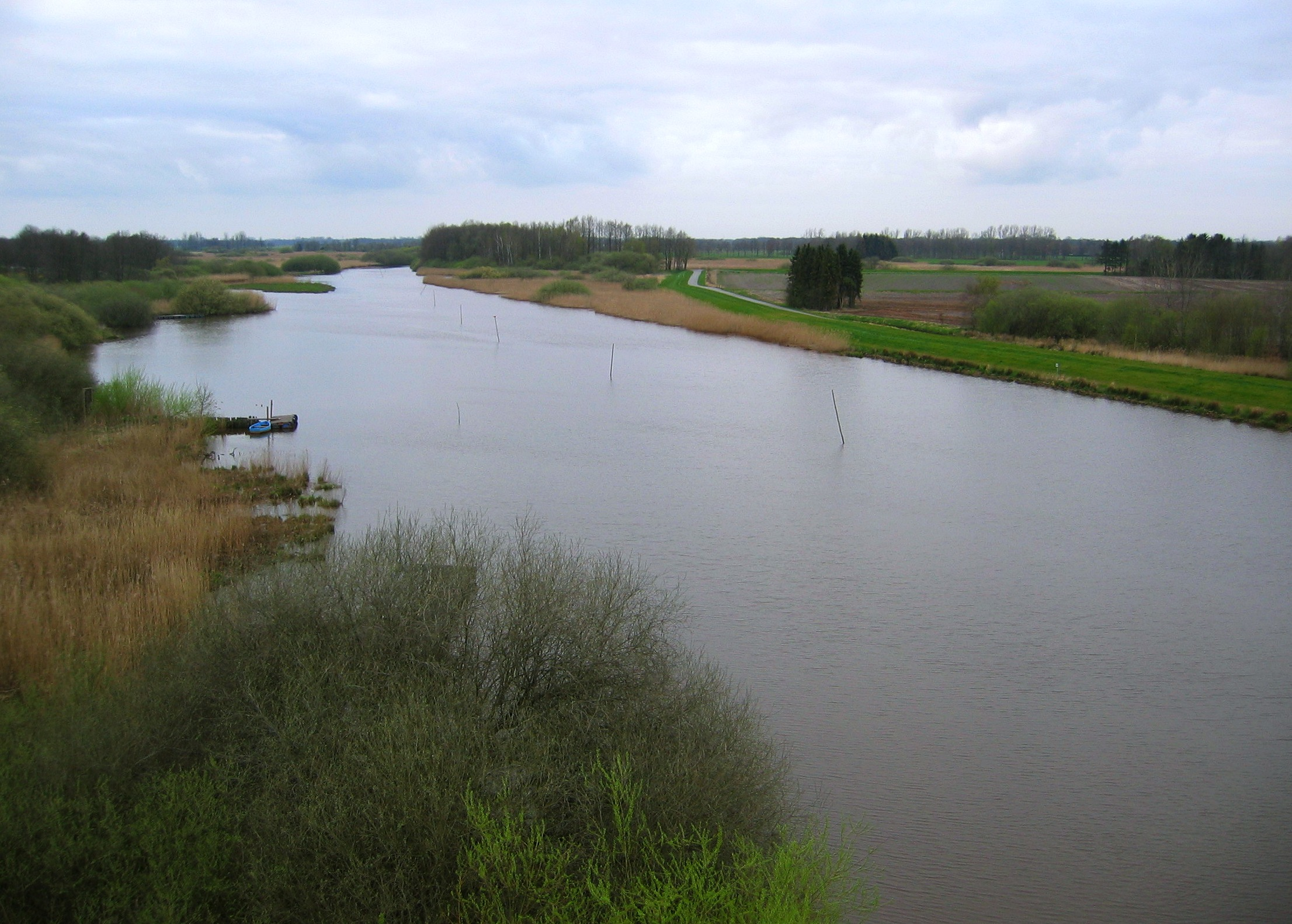
- Soeste in Barßel

Location
- Country: Germany
- State: Lower Saxony

Physical characteristics
- Mouth
  - location: Jümme
  - coordinates: 53.1816°N 7.6870°E

Basin features
- Progression: Jümme→ Leda→ Ems→ North Sea

Soeste is a river in the Cloppenburg district in Lower Saxony, Germany, a tributary of the Ems.

The Soeste forms from two source brooks in Hesselnfeld and Egterholz, two small settlements in the Emstek municipality. It flows northwest through Cloppenburg, where its water flow is already sufficient for water mills to be operated im former times. The Soeste flows into a dam at Thülsfelde (Thülsfelder Talsperre), which was built in the 1920s. From there it flows through the towns Friesoythe and Barßel. West of the latter town, the Soeste flows into the Jümme, which drains into the Ems.

== See also ==
- List of rivers of Lower Saxony
