= Nortmoor =

- Municipality
- Location of Nortmoor within Leer district
- Interactive map of Nortmoor
- Location within Germany Location within Lower Saxony
- Coordinates: 53°14′N 7°34′E
- Country: Germany
- State: Lower Saxony
- District: Leer
- Municipal assoc.: Jümme

Government
  - Mayor: Gerold Ernst (SPD)

Area
  - Total: 15.34 km^{2} (5.92 sq mi)
- Elevation: 0 m (0 ft)

Population (2025-12-31)
  - Total: 1,741
  - Density: 113.5/km^{2} (293.9/sq mi)
- Time zone: UTC+01:00 (CET)
  - Summer (DST): UTC+02:00 (CEST)
- Postal codes: 26845
- Dialling codes: 0 49 50
- Vehicle registration: LER

Nortmoor is a municipality in the district of Leer, in Lower Saxony, Germany.
