= Brinkum =

- Municipality
- Flag Coat of arms

- Location of Brinkum within Leer district
- Interactive map of Brinkum
- Location within Germany Location within Lower Saxony
- Coordinates: 53°16′N 7°34′E
- Country: Germany
- State: Lower Saxony
- District: Leer
- Municipal assoc.: Hesel

Government
  - Mayor: Bernhard Janssen

Area
  - Total: 5.51 km^{2} (2.13 sq mi)
- Elevation: 8 m (26 ft)

Population (2025-12-31)
  - Total: 814
  - Density: 148/km^{2} (383/sq mi)
- Time zone: UTC+01:00 (CET)
  - Summer (DST): UTC+02:00 (CEST)
- Postal codes: 26835
- Dialling codes: 0 49 50
- Vehicle registration: LER
- Website: www.hesel.de

Brinkum is a municipality in the district of Leer, in Lower Saxony, Germany.
