= Holtland =

- Municipality
- Location of Holtland within Leer district
- Interactive map of Holtland
- Location within Germany Location within Lower Saxony
- Coordinates: 53°16′N 7°34′E
- Country: Germany
- State: Lower Saxony
- District: Leer
- Municipal assoc.: Hesel

Government
  - Mayor: Uwe Themann (SPD)

Area
  - Total: 14.66 km^{2} (5.66 sq mi)
- Elevation: 4 m (13 ft)

Population (2025-12-31)
  - Total: 2,197
  - Density: 149.9/km^{2} (388.1/sq mi)
- Time zone: UTC+01:00 (CET)
  - Summer (DST): UTC+02:00 (CEST)
- Postal codes: 26835
- Dialling codes: 0 49 50
- Vehicle registration: LER

Holtland is a municipality in the district of Leer, in Lower Saxony, Germany.
