= Monika Hilker =

Biologist and professor at the Freie Universität Berlin

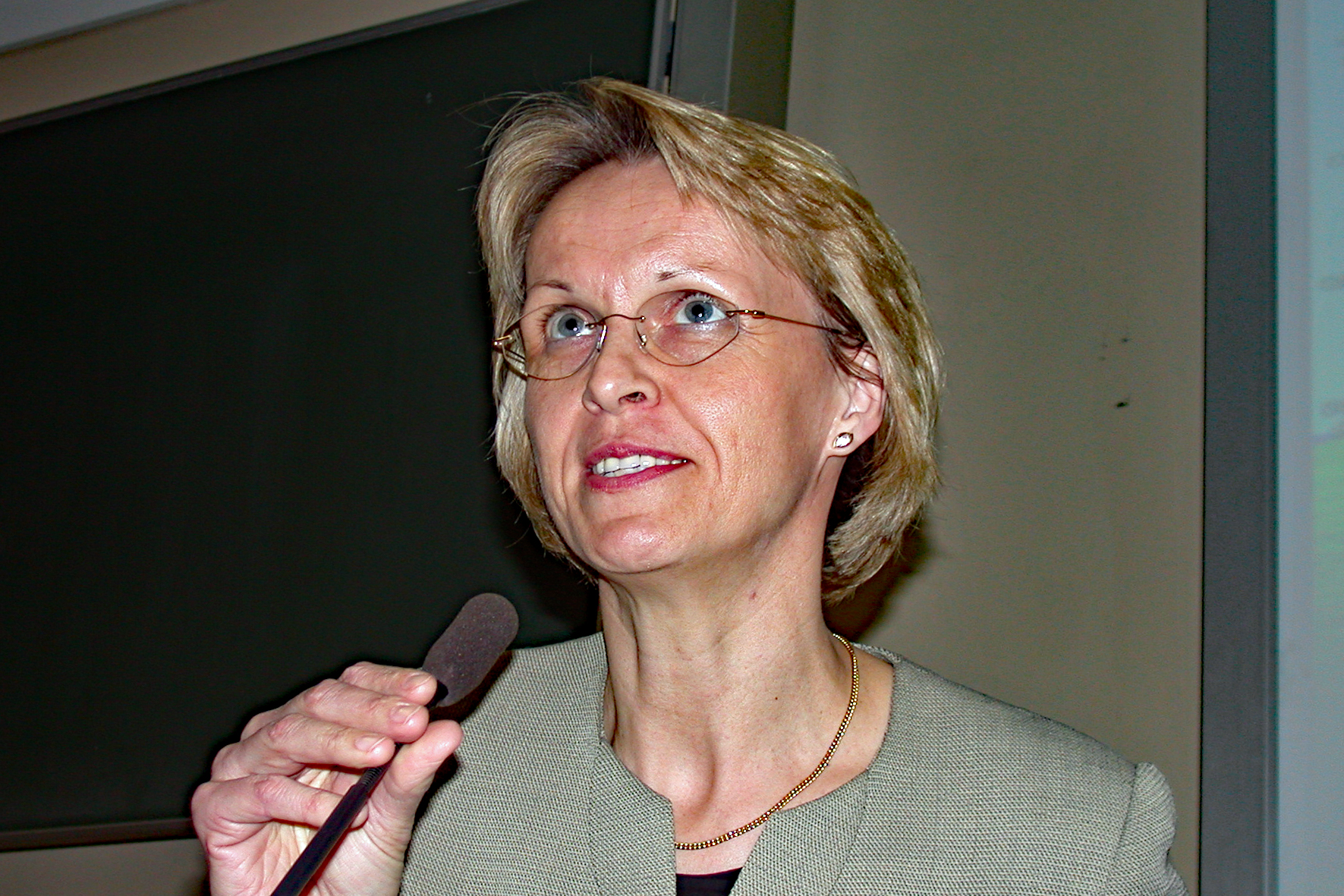
- Monika Hilker in 2003
- Born: 24 March 1959 (age 67); Friesoythe, Germany
- Education: University of Göttingen
- Scientific career
- Fields: Zoology

Monika Hilker (born 24 March 1959 in Friesoythe, Germany) is a biologist and a professor at the Freie Universität Berlin. She leads the Applied Zoology/Animal Ecology working group at the Freie Universität, studying the chemical and molecular ecology of plant-insect interactions. She is also the speaker and director of the Collaborative Research Centre (CRC) 973 "Priming and Memory of Organismic Responses to Stress".

== Education ==
Hilker received a Diploma in biology (forest zoology) at the University of Göttingen in 1983. Her research focused on visual and olfactory orientation in bark beetles. In the same year, she completed a teacher examination in organic chemistry at the same university. She remained at the University of Göttingen to conduct research on pheromones that deter oviposition in moths, receiving her doctoral degree (Dr. rer. nat.) in 1986. She completed her Habilitation (Dr. habil.) in zoology and animal ecology at the University of Bayreuth in 1993, working with leaf beetles.

== Career ==
From 1987 to 1994, Hilker worked as an assistant professor at the University of Bayreuth. In 1994, she accepted a job as a full professor at the Freie Universität Berlin. Hilker served as a member of the DFG (German Research Foundation) senate from 2003 to 2009. She was an associate editor for the Journal of Chemical Ecology from 2004 to 2013 and served as vice president (2009-2010) and then president (2010-2011) of the International Society of Chemical Ecology. She has also been involved in initiatives to promote young researchers and women in science.
