= Jümme (river) =

River in Germany

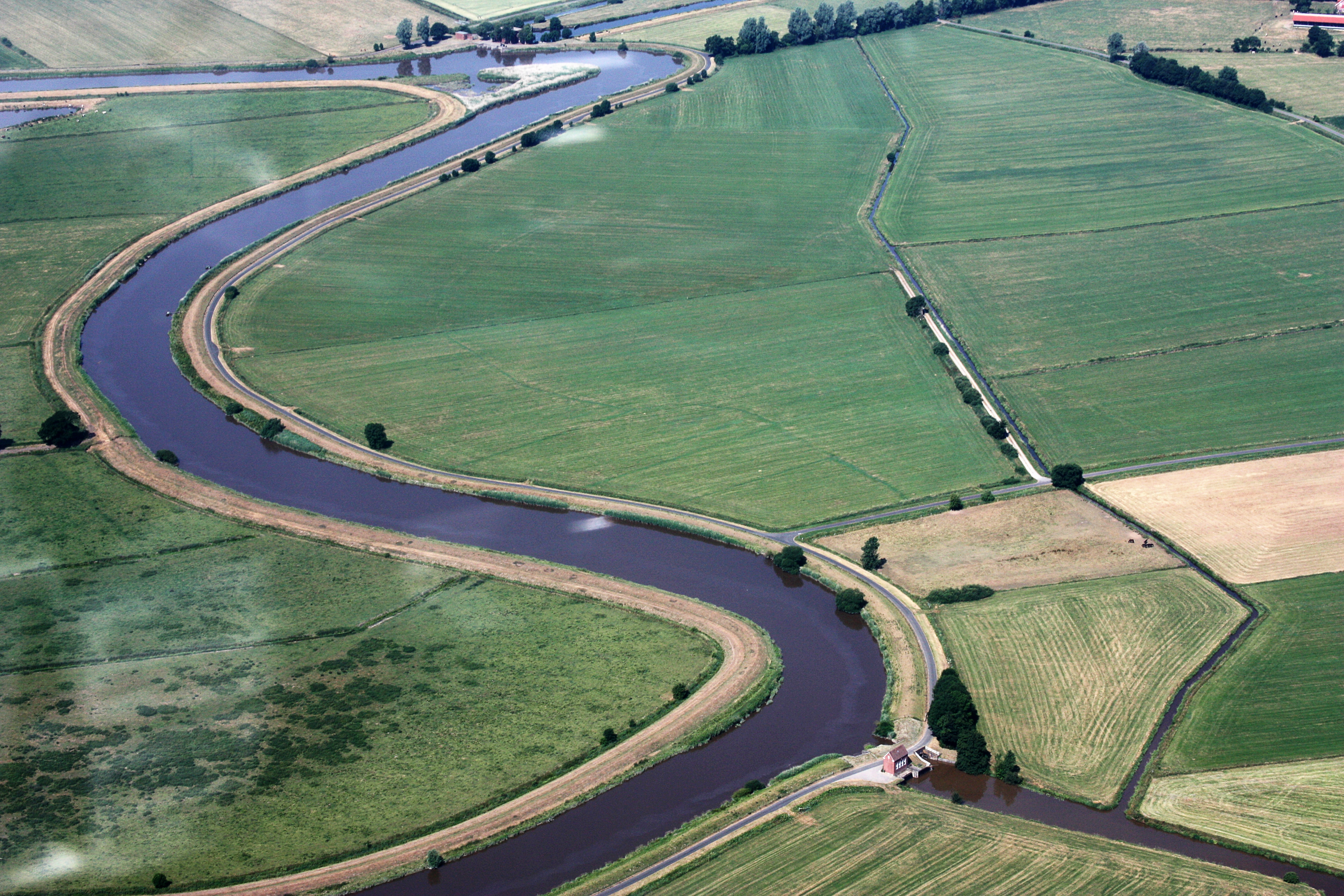
- Aerial photograph of the Jümme

Location
- Country: Germany
- State: Lower Saxony

Physical characteristics
- Source
  - location: Confluence of the Soeste and the Dreyschloot, west of Barßel
  - coordinates: 53°10′54″N 7°41′13″E
  - elevation: < 2 m above sea level (NN)
- Mouth
  - location: East of Leer into the Leda
  - coordinates: 53°13′24″N 7°31′29″E
  - elevation: < 1 m above sea level (NN)
- Length: 95.1 km (59.1 mi)
- Basin size: 1,351 km^{2} (522 sq mi)

Basin features
- Progression: Leda→ Ems→ North Sea

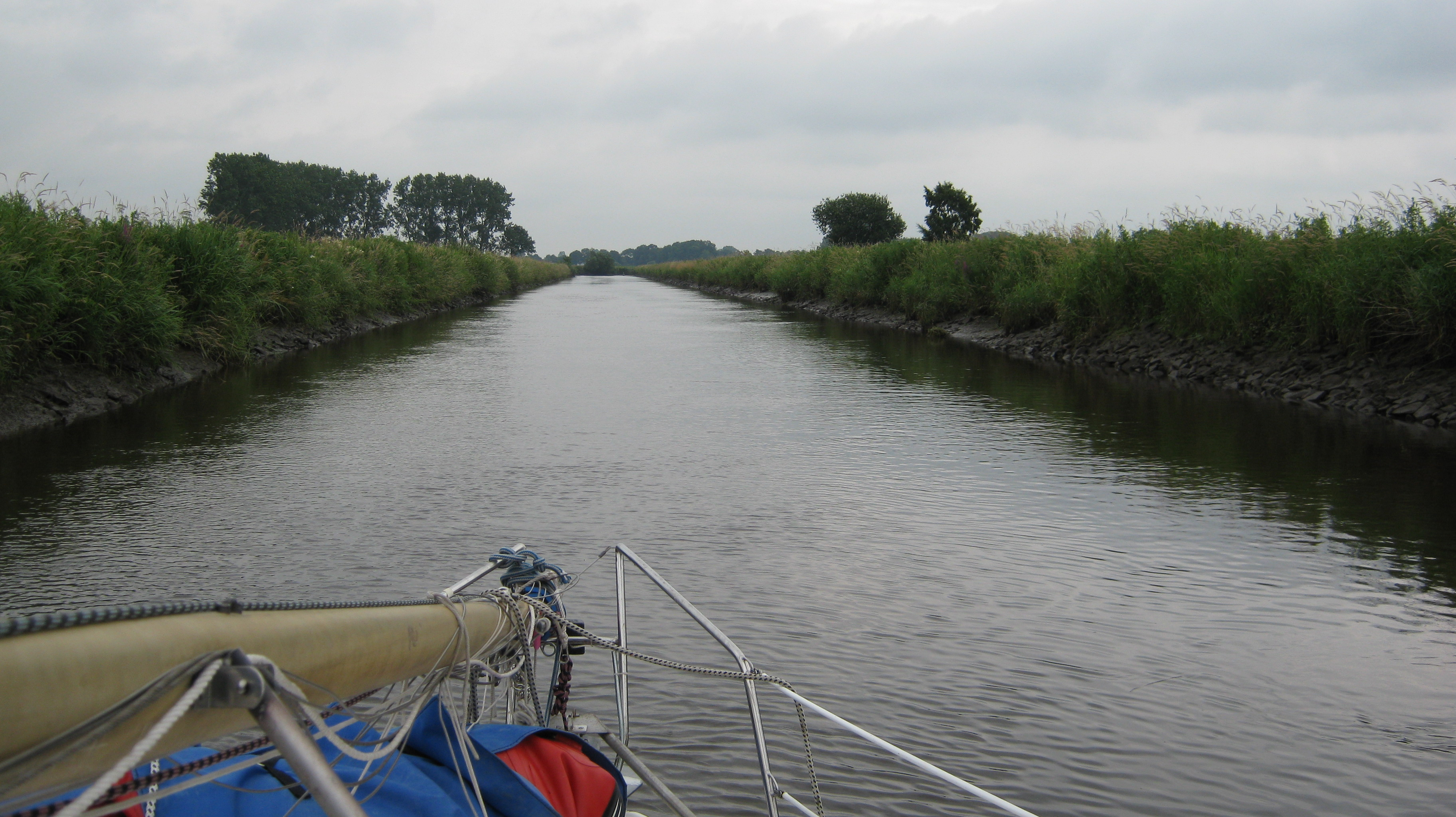
The Jümme seen from a yacht

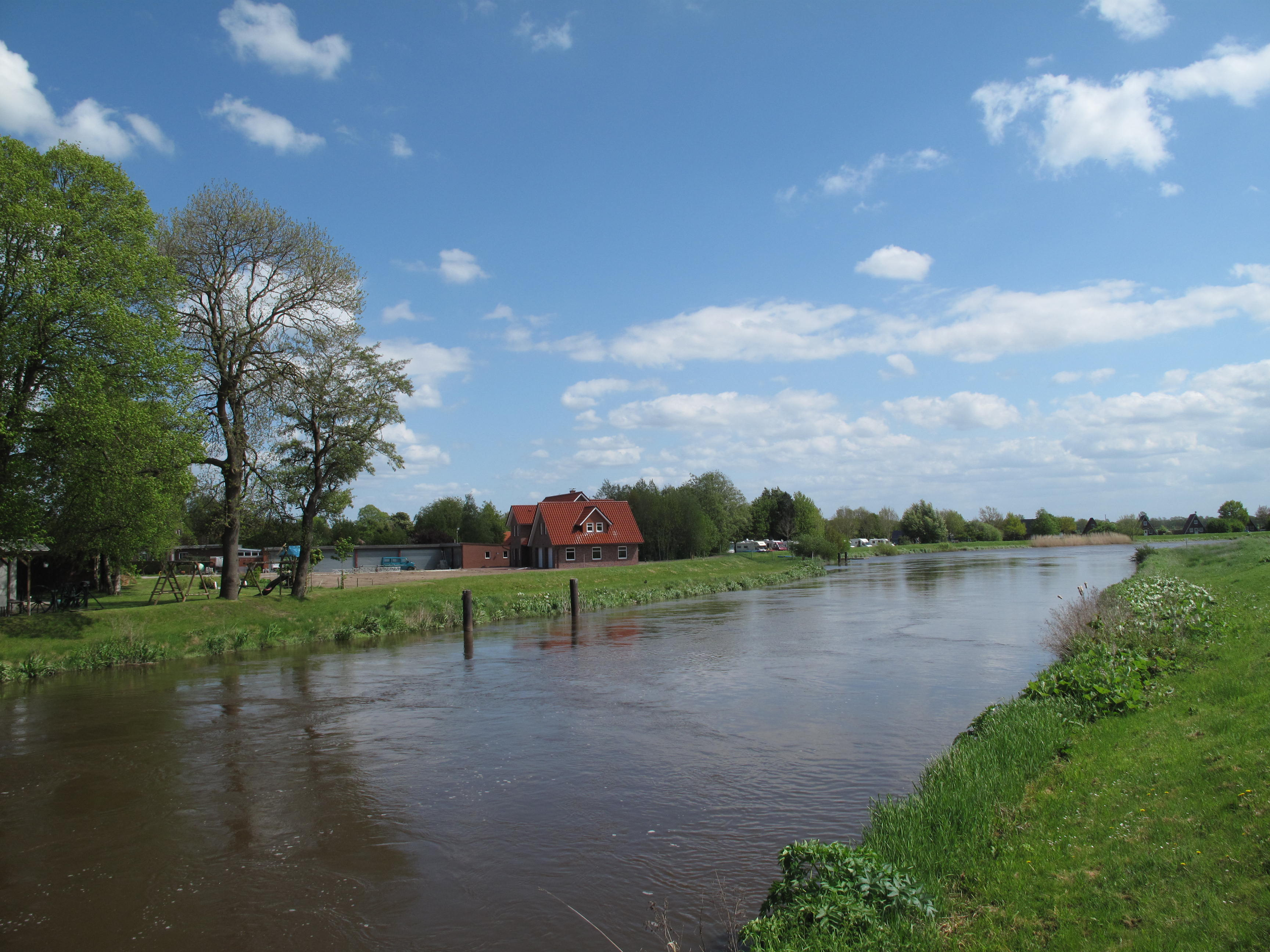
Stickhausen, river: the Jümme

Jümme (German pronunciation: [ˈjʏmə]) is a river of Lower Saxony, Germany. It is a tributary of the Leda.

The Jümme's headwaters are the Aper Tief, which flows from the Oldenburg geest, and the Soeste. The Jümme proper is 19 kilometres (12 mi) long from the Aper Tief to its confluence with the Leda near Wiltshausen and is tidal. Including its source river Soeste, its total length is 95.1 km (59.1 mi).

Fishing rights rest with the local fishing club, Fischereiverein Altes Amt Stickhausen, which issues fishing permits to its members and to visiting anglers.

The Jümme gives its name to the collective municipality of Jümme.

Together with the Leda the Jümme forms the so-called Zweistromland or "Two Rivers Land", the Leda-Jümme region, one of the most charming areas in East Frisia, with its numerous lakes such as the Jümmesee which covers an area of 11 hectares (27 acres).

== See also ==
- List of rivers of Lower Saxony
