= Leda (river) =

River in Germany

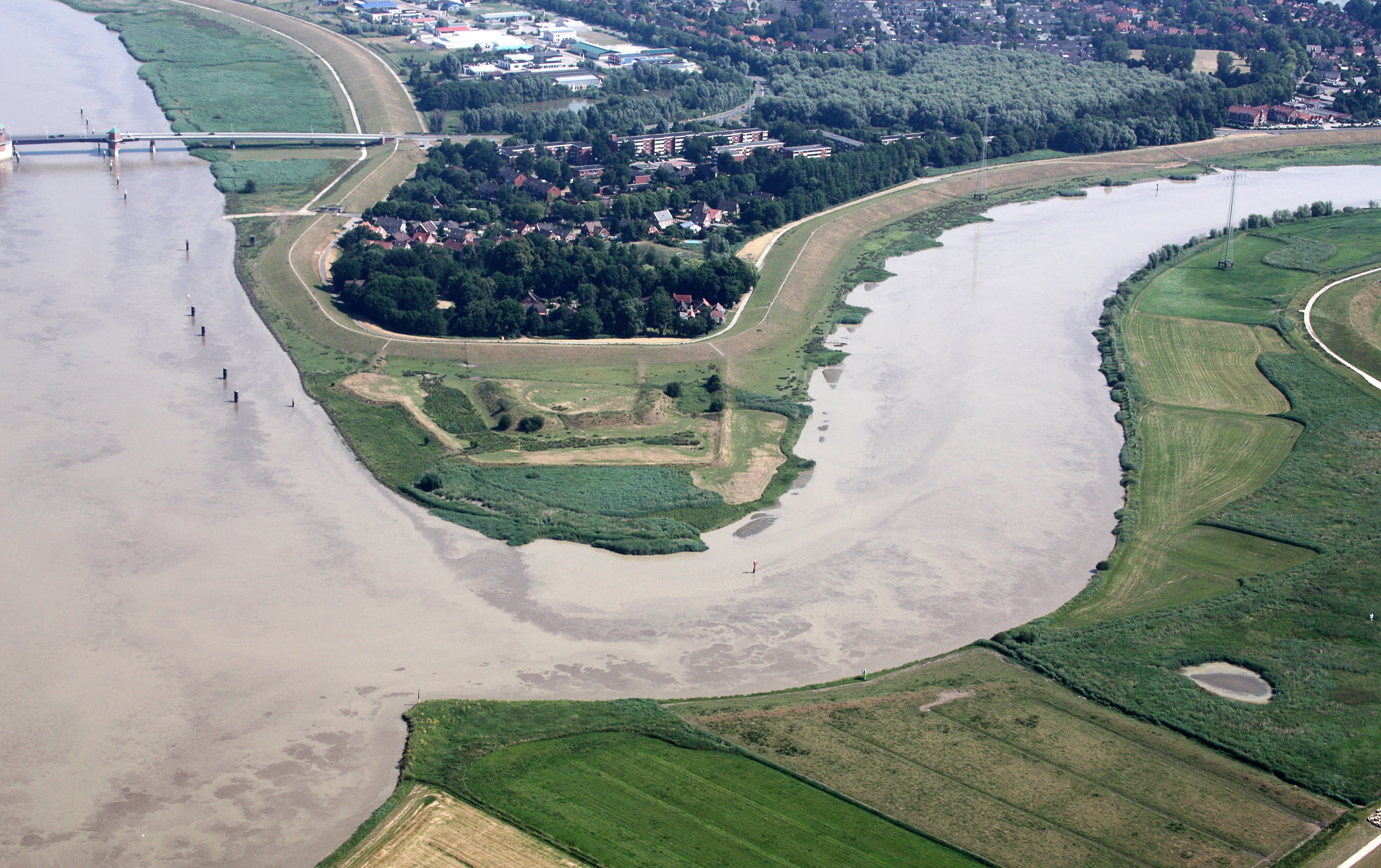

Location
- Country: Germany
- State: Lower Saxony

Physical characteristics
- Source
  - location: northwest of Spahnharrenstätte
  - coordinates: 52°53′30″N 7°34′02″E
  - elevation: 25 m above sea level (NN) as "Ohe"
- Mouth
  - location: southwest of Leer into the Ems
  - coordinates: 53°12′37″N 7°25′27″E
  - elevation: 1 m above sea level (NN)
- Length: 24.2 km (15.0 mi)
- Basin size: 2,096 km^{2} (809 sq mi)

Basin features
- Progression: Ems→ North Sea
- Landmarks: Villages: Breddenberg, Sedelsberg, Ramsloh, Strücklingen, Potshausen
- Tributaries
  - left: Hauptfehn Canal, Polder Canal
  - right: Loruper Beeke, Rittveengraben, Marka, Bollinger Canal, Jümme
- Navigable: 25 km (16 mi)

Leda is a river in north-western Germany in the state of Lower Saxony.

The Leda is a right tributary of the Ems and originates at the confluence of the Sagter Ems and the Dreyschloot (a branch of the Soeste) near Barßel. The Leda flows into the Ems near the town of Leer. On the southern bank of the Leda, in the Overledingen Land (Overledingen="country over the Leda"), opposite Leer, lies the small settlement of Kloster Muhde (Muhde from the Old Frisian mutha meaning "(river) mouth"). The total length of the river is 24.2 kilometres (15.0 mi) (72.3 km (44.9 mi) including the source rivers Sagter Ems and Ohe).

The lower 1.85 kilometres (1.15 mi) until the port of Leer are navigable for large (Class Vb) ships, a further 7 km until the mouth of the Jümme for Class II ships and a further 16 km until the Elisabethfehnkanal are navigable but not classified.

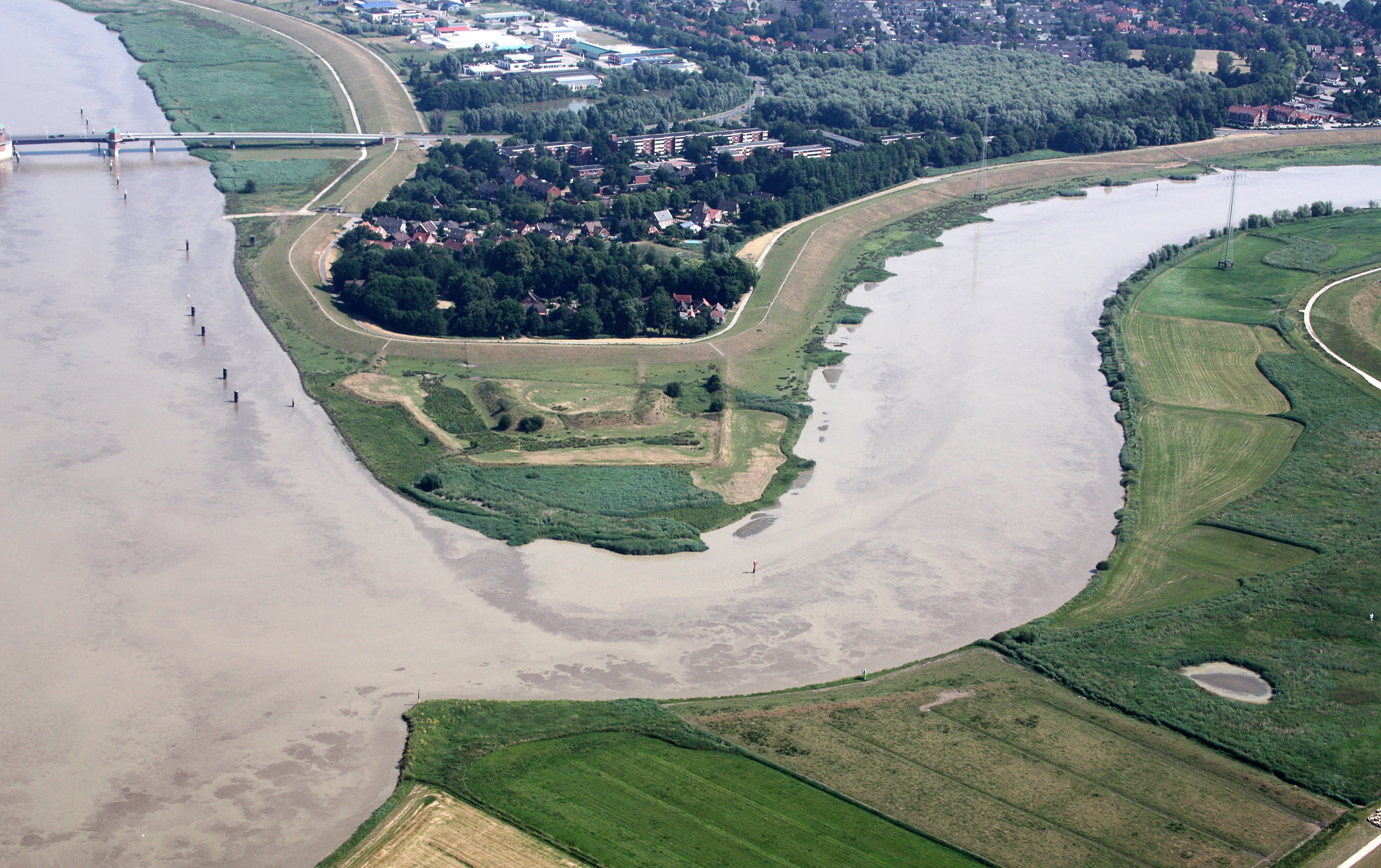
Mouth of the Leda on the Ems

In East Frisia the Sagter Ems, a headstream of the Leda, is also known as the Leda.

== See also ==
- List of rivers of Lower Saxony
