= Detern =

- Municipality
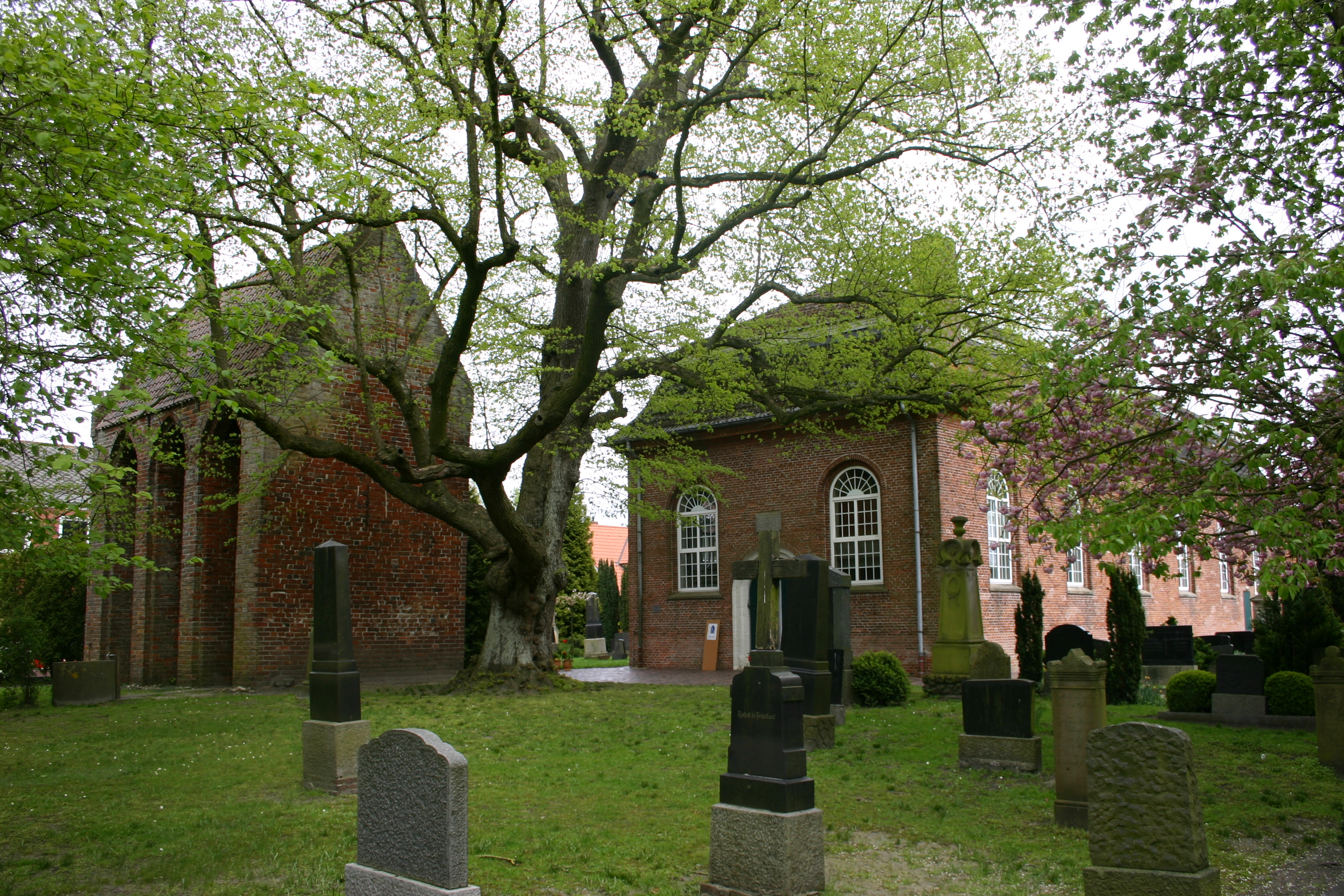
- Historic Ss. Stephen's and Bartholomew's Church

- Coat of arms

- Location of Detern within Leer district
- Interactive map of Detern
- Location within Germany Location within Lower Saxony
- Coordinates: 53°14′N 7°38′E
- Country: Germany
- State: Lower Saxony
- District: Leer
- Municipal assoc.: Jümme

Government
  - Mayor: Franz-Gerhard Brakenhoff

Area
  - Total: 43.3 km^{2} (16.7 sq mi)
- Elevation: 3 m (9.8 ft)

Population (2025-12-31)
  - Total: 2,733
  - Density: 63.1/km^{2} (163/sq mi)
- Time zone: UTC+01:00 (CET)
  - Summer (DST): UTC+02:00 (CEST)
- Postal codes: 26847
- Dialling codes: 0 49 57
- Vehicle registration: LER
- Website: www.detern.de

Detern is a municipality in the district of Leer, in Lower Saxony, Germany.

The Battle of Detern was fought here in 1426.
