= Ostrhauderfehn =

- Municipality
- Flag Coat of arms

- Location of Ostrhauderfehn within Leer district
- Interactive map of Ostrhauderfehn
- Location within Germany Location within Lower Saxony
- Coordinates: 53°07′N 07°37′E
- Country: Germany
- State: Lower Saxony
- District: Leer

Government
  - Mayor (2021–26): Günter Harders (Ind.)

Area
  - Total: 51.00 km^{2} (19.69 sq mi)
- Elevation: 3 m (9.8 ft)

Population (2025-12-31)
  - Total: 12,002
  - Density: 235.3/km^{2} (609.5/sq mi)
- Time zone: UTC+01:00 (CET)
  - Summer (DST): UTC+02:00 (CEST)
- Postal codes: 26842
- Dialling codes: 0 49 52
- Vehicle registration: LER
- Website: www.ostrhauderfehn.de

Ostrhauderfehn is a municipality in the Leer district of Lower Saxony, Germany.

It split from Rhauderfehn sometime between 1820 and 1830. Ostrhauderfehn was for many years one of the largest municipalities in the district of Leer.
