= Hesel =

- Municipality
- Coat of arms

- Location of Hesel within Leer district
- Interactive map of Hesel
- Location within Germany Location within Lower Saxony
- Coordinates: 53°18′N 7°36′E
- Country: Germany
- State: Lower Saxony
- District: Leer
- Municipal assoc.: Hesel

Government
  - Mayor: Heiko Müller (CDU)

Area
  - Total: 44.02 km^{2} (17.00 sq mi)
- Elevation: 12–17 m (39–56 ft)

Population (2025-12-31)
  - Total: 4,697
  - Density: 106.7/km^{2} (276.4/sq mi)
- Time zone: UTC+01:00 (CET)
  - Summer (DST): UTC+02:00 (CEST)
- Postal codes: 26835
- Dialling codes: 0 49 50
- Vehicle registration: LER
- Website: www.hesel.de

Hesel is a municipality in Leer district. It is situated approximately 12 km (7.5 mi) northeast of Leer, and 25 km (16 mi) east of Emden.

Hesel is also the seat of the Samtgemeinde ("collective municipality") Hesel.
