= Uplengen =

- Municipality
- Flag Coat of arms

- Location of Uplengen within Leer district
- Interactive map of Uplengen
- Location within Germany Location within Lower Saxony
- Coordinates: 53°16′N 7°45′E
- Country: Germany
- State: Lower Saxony
- District: Leer
- Subdivisions: 19 districts

Government
  - Mayor (2017–25): Heinz Trauernicht (CDU)

Area
  - Total: 149 km^{2} (58 sq mi)
- Elevation: 6 m (20 ft)

Population (2025-12-31)
  - Total: 12,030
  - Density: 80.7/km^{2} (209/sq mi)
- Time zone: UTC+01:00 (CET)
  - Summer (DST): UTC+02:00 (CEST)
- Postal codes: 26670
- Dialling codes: 0 49 56 / 0 44 89
- Vehicle registration: LER
- Website: www.uplengen.de

Uplengen is a municipality in the Leer district, in Lower Saxony, Germany.

== Parts of the municipality ==
- Bühren
- Großoldendorf
- Großsander
- Hollen
- Jübberde
- Klein Remels
- Kleinoldendorf
- Kleinsander
- Meinersfehn
- Neudorf
- Neufirrel
- Nordgeorgsfehn
- Oltmannsfehn
- Poghausen
- Remels
- Selverde
- Spols
- Stapel
- Südgeorgsfehn

== Gallery ==
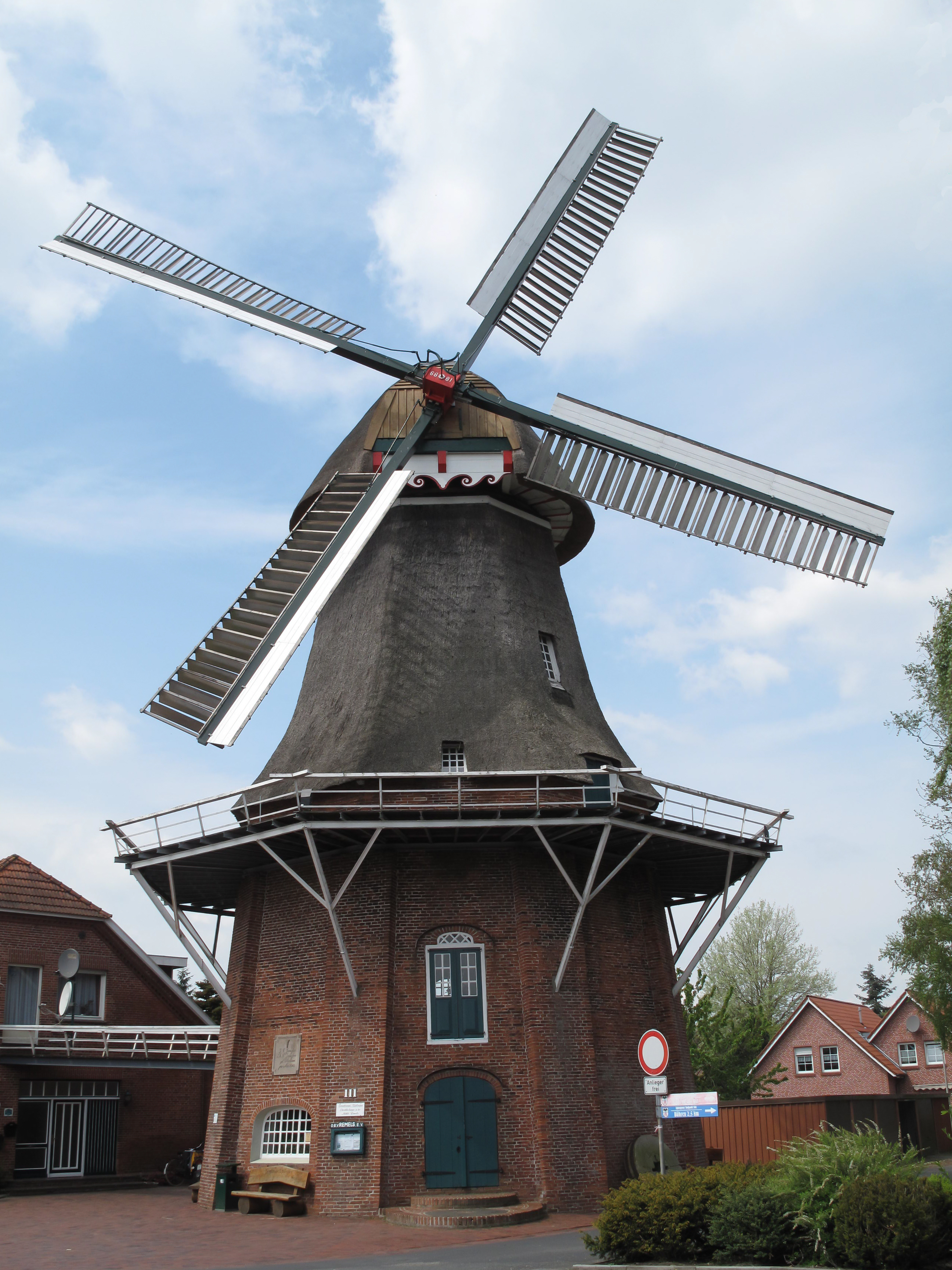
Remels, windmill

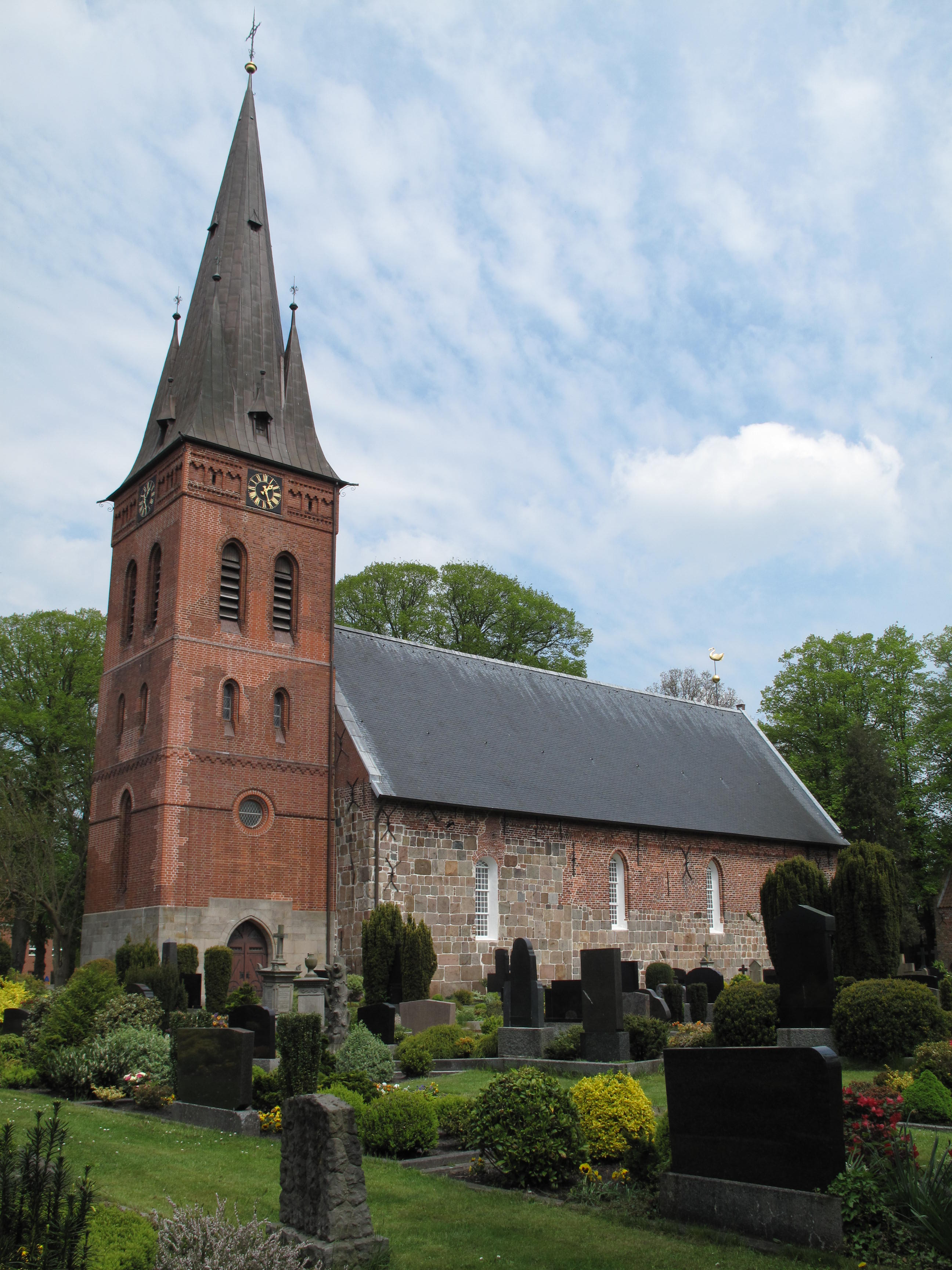
Remels, church

== Population ==
- Lutheranism - 84.29%
- Reformed churches - 1.48%
- Catholic - 2.71%
- Different - 11.52%

== Politics ==
The 27 seats of the local council are distributed as follows:

- CDU—20 seats
- SPD—8 seats
