= Leer (district) =

District in Lower Saxony, Germany

Coordinates: 53°15′N 7°30′E

- District
- Flag Coat of arms
- Country: Germany
- State: Lower Saxony
- Capital: Leer

Government
  - District admin.: Matthias Groote (SPD)

Area
  - Total: 1,086 km^{2} (419 sq mi)

Population (31 December 2022)
  - Total: 174,348
  - Density: 160/km^{2} (420/sq mi)
- Time zone: UTC+01:00 (CET)
  - Summer (DST): UTC+02:00 (CEST)
- Vehicle registration: LER
- Website: landkreis-leer.de

Leer is a district (Landkreis) in Lower Saxony, Germany. It is bounded by (from the northwest and clockwise) the city of Emden, the districts of Aurich, Wittmund, Friesland, Ammerland, Cloppenburg and Emsland, and by the Netherlands (Province of Groningen).

== History ==
In 1744, East Frisia was annexed by Prussia. In 1867, the region was subdivided into districts, and the districts of Leer and Weener were established. In 1932, these two districts were merged.

== Geography ==
The District is located in the southern part of East Frisia. The Ems River runs through the District, coming out of the Emsland in the south and flowing into the Dollart, a bay of the North Sea. The island of Borkum, belonging to the East Frisian Islands, is also a part of the District. Some of the area of the District is in the Lower Saxony Wadden Sea National Park.

== Coat-of-arms ==
The coat-of-arms is identical to the arms of the East Frisian chieftain dynasty Ukena, rulers of the area during the 15th century. Its blazon is: "Arms: Azure, a lion rampant dexter-facing Argent armed and langued Gules, collared by a wreath of leaves proper. Crown: two plumes of wheat Vert divided by a four-leaf clover proper at center."

== Cities and municipalities ==
Clickable map of towns and municipalities in the district

Cities	Samtgemeinden
1. Borkum; 2. Leer; 3. Weener; Free municipalities: 1. Bunde; 2. Jemgum; 3. Moormerland; 4. Ostrhauderfehn; 5. Rhauderfehn; 6. Uplengen; 7. Westoverledingen	1. Hesel; 1. Brinkum; 2. Firrel; 3. Hesel^{1}; 4. Holtland; 5. Neukamperfehn; 6. Schwerinsdorf; 2. Jümme; 1. Detern; 2. Filsum^{1}; 3. Nortmoor
	^{1}seat of the Samtgemeinde

Unincorporated Area
The uninhabited island Lütje Hörn is also part of Leer district, but not part of any municipality (unincorporated area).
