= Friesoythe =

Town in Cloppenburg, Lower Saxony, Germany

- Town
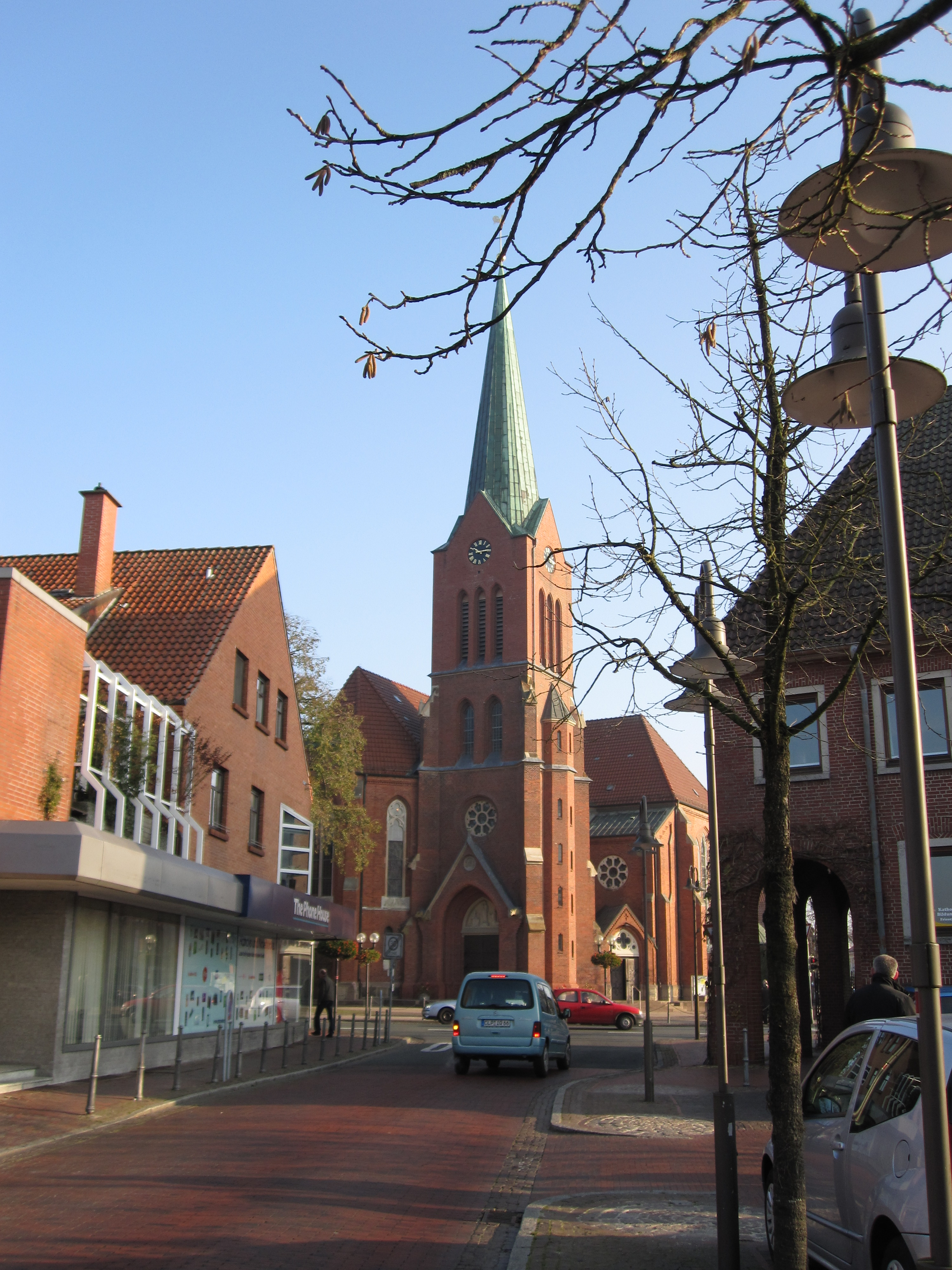
- Church

- Flag Coat of arms

- Location of Friesoythe within Cloppenburg district
- Interactive map of Friesoythe
- Location within Germany Location within Lower Saxony
- Coordinates: 53°01′14″N 07°51′31″E
- Country: Germany
- State: Lower Saxony
- District: Cloppenburg

Government
  - Mayor (2021–26): Sven Stratmann (SPD)

Area
  - Total: 247.14 km^{2} (95.42 sq mi)
- Elevation: 6 m (20 ft)

Population (2025-12-31)
  - Total: 22,806
  - Density: 92.280/km^{2} (239.00/sq mi)
- Time zone: UTC+01:00 (CET)
  - Summer (DST): UTC+02:00 (CEST)
- Postal codes: 26169
- Dialling codes: 0 44 91
- Vehicle registration: CLP
- Website: www.friesoythe.de

Friesoythe, (German pronunciation: [friːˈzɔʏtə] or [friːsˈʔɔʏtə]; Low German: Aithe; Saterland Frisian: Ait or Äit) is a town in the district of Cloppenburg, Lower Saxony, Germany, on the river Soeste, 25 kilometres (16 mi) northwest of Cloppenburg, and 30 kilometres (19 mi) southwest of Oldenburg.

== History ==
In 1227, Count Otto von Tecklenburg made Oite Castle in Friesoythe, which had just been built, his residence. Farmers, merchants and craftsmen quickly settled near the castle. As early as the first half of the 13th century, Friesoythe had extensive trade relations, as evidenced by the coin find from Friesoythe, whose more than 300 silver coins from Cologne, Münster, Osnabrück and other cities were only in circulation until 1235. Today's city center was soon surrounded by a massive city wall and was long considered impregnable. 1308 Friesoythe was first mentioned as a town. Friesoythe is occasionally referred to as a "Hanseatic town" and is said to have enjoyed Hanseatic privileges. It is unclear whether Friesoythe actually belonged to the Hanseatic League.

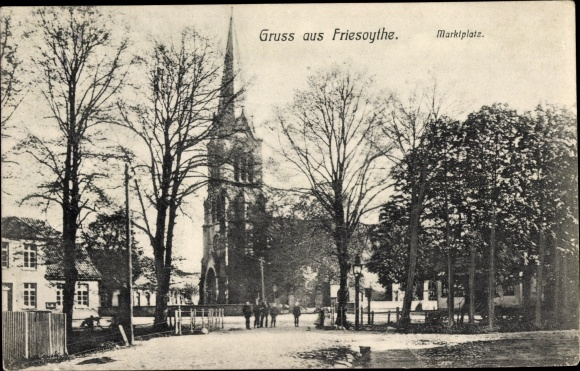
Friesoythe in 1906.

Friesoythe shares a diverse culture in Lower Saxony history. Many cultural influences of German, Anglo-Saxon, Dutch, East Frisian, Danish and Swedish culture are noticeable in the town and citizens. The town has a large following of Roman Catholicism and small percentages of Calvinism and Lutheranism. It was part of the Duchy of Oldenburg and also under rule to the French Empire in the 18th century.

=== Second World War ===
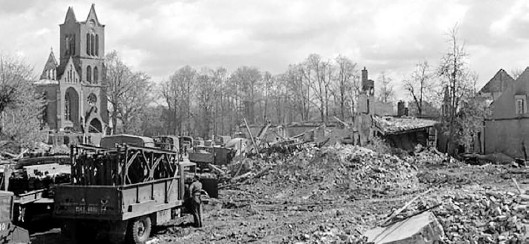
Ruins of Friesoythe after the city was burned by Canadian troops in April 1945.

In April 1945, the town of Friesoythe was evacuated and then occupied by the 4th Canadian (Armoured) Division, under General Christopher Vokes. Most of the town's population of 4,000 had moved out to the surrounding countryside on about April 11–12, 1945.

The town was defended by some 200 paratroopers of Battalion Raabe of the 7th German Parachute Division. These paratroopers repelled the first attack by the Lake Superior Regiment (Motor) on April 13. The Lake Superior Regiment suffered two dead and nineteen wounded. German casualties are not known.

Vokes ordered the resumption of the attack the next day by The Argyll and Sutherland Highlanders of Canada (Princess Louise's) commanded by Lieutenant Colonel Frederick E. Wigle. The attack went well, with the Argylls securing the town by 10:30 hours. However, at 08:30 a small number of German soldiers caught Wigle's tactical headquarters by surprise, killing Wigle and several other soldiers. Lieutenant Alan Earp survived a bullet through the head.

Vokes ordered an immediate reprisal. "A first-rate officer of mine, for whom I had a special regard and affection, and in whom I had a particular professional interest because of his talent for command, was killed. Not merely killed, it was reported to me, but sniped in the back". According to Vokes, "I summoned my GSO1 . . 'Mac,' I roared at him, 'I'm going to raze that goddam town.'"

Units and soldiers of the Argylls had spontaneously begun burning buildings in Friesoythe as revenge for the death of their colonel, but Vokes later issued a direct order, and the town was systematically set on fire with flamethrowers mounted on Wasp Carriers. The rubble was used to reinforce district roads for the division's tanks. According to German estimates, 85% to 90% of the town was destroyed, making it one of the most devastated towns in Germany at the time. Vokes commented that he had "No feeling of remorse over the elimination of Friesoythe." The Argyll and Sutherland Highlanders and the Lake Superior Regiment (Motor) were awarded the battle honour "Friesoythe".

=== 21st century ===
Friesoythe grown from a village to a small city, shares traditional and modern style buildings of German architecture, Bauhaus, Victorian style, Renaissance and Baroque style. Large multinational companies settled within, giving the city a modern appearance and lively feeling. Hospital, schooling, bus service, health service are all available in the city centre. The city has communication and infrastructure and many American Germans, Poles and Russians integrated into its population.

== Climate ==
Climate data for Friesoythe-Altenoythe (1991–2020 normals)
Month	Jan	Feb	Mar	Apr	May	Jun	Jul	Aug	Sep	Oct	Nov	Dec	Year
Mean daily maximum °C (°F)	4.8 (40.6)	5.9 (42.6)	9.3 (48.7)	14.2 (57.6)	18.2 (64.8)	21.0 (69.8)	23.4 (74.1)	23.1 (73.6)	19.4 (66.9)	14.4 (57.9)	8.8 (47.8)	5.9 (42.6)	14.0 (57.2)
Daily mean °C (°F)	2.6 (36.7)	3.0 (37.4)	5.3 (41.5)	9.2 (48.6)	13.2 (55.8)	16.2 (61.2)	18.3 (64.9)	17.8 (64.0)	14.3 (57.7)	10.4 (50.7)	6.1 (43.0)	3.7 (38.7)	10.0 (50.0)
Mean daily minimum °C (°F)	0.2 (32.4)	0.4 (32.7)	1.8 (35.2)	4.4 (39.9)	8.2 (46.8)	11.3 (52.3)	13.3 (55.9)	12.9 (55.2)	10.1 (50.2)	7.0 (44.6)	3.5 (38.3)	1.5 (34.7)	6.2 (43.2)
Average precipitation mm (inches)	64.6 (2.54)	53.8 (2.12)	53.3 (2.10)	47.3 (1.86)	56.6 (2.23)	70.2 (2.76)	77.3 (3.04)	75.5 (2.97)	71.0 (2.80)	61.9 (2.44)	61.9 (2.44)	74.2 (2.92)	767 (30.2)
Average precipitation days (≥ 1.0 mm)	18.1	16.5	15.3	13.7	13.5	14.8	14.9	14.8	14.6	17.1	17.5	19.2	189.8
Average snowy days (≥ 1.0 cm)	4.3	3.5	1.6	0	0	0	0	0	0	0.1	0.7	2.9	13.1
Average relative humidity (%)	89.4	85.7	81.5	76.7	74.7	75.5	77.6	79.8	85.3	87.0	90.4	90.5	82.8
Mean monthly sunshine hours	64.7	85.2	134.7	171.0	191.2	211.9	224.2	216.2	163.1	112.5	69.0	54.5	1,698.2
Source: World Meteorological Organization

== Notable people ==
- Wilhelm Abeln (1894–1969), farmer and politician, member of Oldenburg Landtag
- Monika Hilker (born 1959), biologist
- Franz-Josef Holzenkamp (born 1969), politician (CDU)
- Heinrich Totting von Oyta (c. 1330–1397), theologian and philosopher, co-founder of the Catholic Faculty of Theology of the University of Vienna
- Lukas Reinken (born 1995), politician (CDU)

== Bibliography ==
- G. L. Cassidy, Warpath; the Story of the Algonquin Regiment, 1939–1945. Toronto: Ryerson Press, 1948.
- Ferdinand Cloppenburg, Die Stadt Friesoythe im zwanzigsten Jahrhundert. Friesoythe: Cloppenburg, 2003. Limited to 1,000 copies.
- Tony Foster, Meeting of Generals. Toronto; New York: Methuen, c1986.
- Robert L. Fraser, ed. Black Yesterdays; the Argylls' War. Hamilton, ON: Argyll Regimental Foundation, 1996. A work of 608 pp., numerous photographs, many illustrations, (some col.) limited to 1,000 copies. A lavish, massive, even monumental history of the Canadian Argylls during World War II and a model of its kind.
- Friesoythe 25 Jahre danach: 1945-1970. Friesoythe: Stadt Friesoythe, 1970.
- Landkreis Emsland. Wege aus dem Chaos; Das Emsland und Niedersachsen 1945-1949. Begleitbuch zur Ausstellung. 2. Aufl. Hrsg. vom Landkreis Emsland. Meppen: 1988.
- C. P. Stacey, A Date with History; Memoirs of a Canadian Historian. Ottawa, ON: Deneau, c1983?
- C. P. Stacey, Official History of the Canadian Army in the Second World War. Vol. III. The Victory Campaign; the Operation in North-West Europe, 1944–1945. Ottawa: Queen's Printer, 1960.
- Chris Vokes, Vokes, My Story. By Major General Chris Vokes with John P. Maclean. Memorial Edition. Ottawa, ON: Gallery Books, 1985.
- War Diary, Argyll and Sutherland Highlanders of Canada, April 14, 1945, pp. 10–11. Ottawa, ON, Canada. National Archives of Canada, RG 24, v. 15,005
- War Diary, 1st Battalion, The Lake Superior Regiment (Motor), April 12, 1945, sheet 15. Ottawa, ON, Canada. National Archives of Canada, RG 24, Vol. 15,099.
- War Diary, General Staff, 4th Canadian Armoured Division, April 14, 1945, p. 15. Ottawa, ON, Canada. National Archives of Canada, RG 24, no. 13,794.
- August Wöhrmann, "Die Kämpfe 1945 in und um Friesoythe," IN Friesoythe 25 Jahre danach: 1945-1970 (Friesoythe: Stadt Friesoythe, 1970) 8-29. Wöhrmann was the first to make a serious examination of the issue, and this work is a ground-breaking study of great value which identifies many of the relevant sources. Unfortunately Wöhrmann, a former soldier himself, reports he was unable to make any contact with the German paratroopers who defended Friesoythe.
