= Oldenburg Land =

Historical region in Lower Saxony

Oldenburger Land
- Region, regional association, and district of the Grand Duchy of Oldenburg, the Free State of Oldenburg, and Oldenburg
- Flag of Oldenburg 1774–1871 and 1921–1935 Coat of arms of the Grand Duchy of Oldenburg

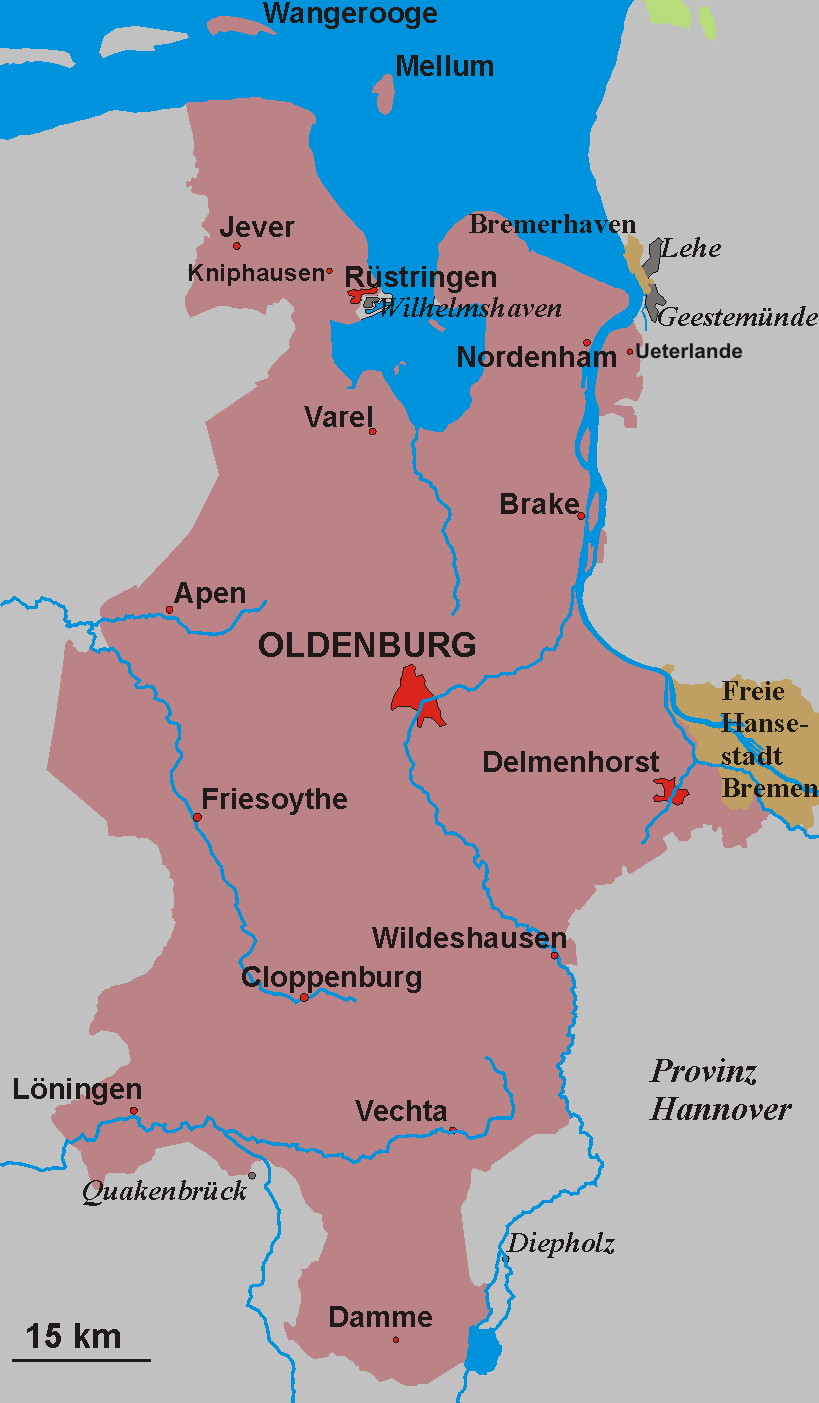
- History
  - Established: 1993

Oldenburg Land (German: Oldenburger Land) is a region and regional association in the German state of Lower Saxony in the area of the former Grand Duchy of Oldenburg (1815–1918), the later Free State of Oldenburg (1918–1946) and administrative district of Oldenburg (1946 to 1978), without its exclaves, along the rivers Hunte and Hase. In the region between coastline, Dümmer and Damme Hills some of the population still speak Low German today and, in Saterland also Saterland Frisian. The region is rich in old Lower Saxon customs such as Schützenfests or Kohlfahrten. Typical country sports include Klootschießen and Boßeln.

The mainly Catholic southern part of the Oldenburg Land is known as Oldenburg Münsterland, the mainly Lutheran northern part is known as Oldenburg Land (Old Oldenburg) in its narrower sense.

In terms of Germany's modern administrative districts, Oldenburg Land roughly corresponds to Ammerland, Cloppenburg, Delmenhorst, Friesland, Oldenburg (rural), Oldenburg (urban), Vechta, Wesermarsch, and Wilhelmshaven. These 9 districts have a combined population of about 1.1 million (per the end of 2016) and an area of about 5,700 km2 (2,200 mi2).

The borders of the Oldenburg Land are still clear today from the boundaries of institutions such the Evangelical Lutheran Church in Oldenburg, the Offizialatsbezirk Vechta of the Roman Catholic Diocese of Münster and the Landessparkasse zu Oldenburg.

== Towns and villages ==
The largest towns, apart from the former state and district capital of Oldenburg with about 160,000 inhabitants are Wilhelmshaven (~ 83,000) and Delmenhorst (~75,000). Other large towns include:

- Apen
- Bad Zwischenahn
- Bakum
- Barßel
- Bern
- Bockhorn
- Bösel
- Brake
- Butjadingen
- Cappeln (Oldenburg)
- Cloppenburg
- Damme
- Dinklage
- Dötlingen
- Edewecht
- Emstek
- Elsfleth
- Essen (Oldenburg)
- Friesoythe
- Ganderkesee
- Garrel
- Goldenstedt
- Großenkneten
- Harpstedt
- Hatten
- Holdorf (Oldenburg)
- Hude (Oldenburg)
- Jade
- Jever
- Lastrup
- Lemwerder
- Lindern
- Lohne (Oldenburg)
- Löningen
- Molbergen
- Neuenkirchen-Vörden
- Nordenham
- Ovelgönne
- Rastede
- Sande
- Saterland
- Schortens
- Stadland
- Steinfeld (Oldenburg)
- Varel
- Vechta
- Visbek
- Wangerland
- Wangerooge
- Wardenburg
- Westerstede
- Wiefelstede
- Wildeshausen
- Zetel

== Sources ==
- Gerhard Wietek: Oldenburger Land (Deutsche Lande – Deutsche Kunst). 2. Auflage, München/Berlin 1974
