= Visbek =

- Municipality
- Coat of arms

- Location of Visbek within Vechta district
- Interactive map of Visbek
- Location within Germany Location within Lower Saxony
- Coordinates: 52°50′11.74″N 08°18′35.12″E
- Country: Germany
- State: Lower Saxony
- District: Vechta
- Subdivisions: 13 hamlets

Government
  - Mayor (2019–24): Gerd Meyer (CDU)

Area
  - Total: 84.08 km^{2} (32.46 sq mi)
- Elevation: 49 m (161 ft)

Population (2025-12-31)
  - Total: 9,885
  - Density: 117.6/km^{2} (304.5/sq mi)
- Time zone: UTC+01:00 (CET)
  - Summer (DST): UTC+02:00 (CEST)
- Postal codes: 49429
- Dialling codes: 04445, 04447 (Hagstedt)
- Vehicle registration: VEC
- Website: www.visbek.de

Visbek (Old Saxon Fiscbechi) is a municipality in the district of Vechta, in the Oldenburg Münsterland region of the state of Lower Saxony, Germany.

== Location and municipal subdivisions ==
Visbek lies on the North German Plain, approximately 12 km to the north of Vechta. The municipality consists of the village of Visbek itself, together with 13 surrounding hamlets (German: Bauerschaften), viz. Astrup, Bonrechtern, Endel, Erlte, Hagstedt, Halter/Meyerhöfen, Hogenbögen, Norddöllen, Rechterfeld, Varnhorn/Siedenbögen and Wöstendöllen.

== Neighbouring municipalities ==
Neighbouring communities are (counting clockwise from north): the municipality of Großenkneten, including Ahlhorn, the town of Wildeshausen, the municipality of Goldenstedt, the town of Vechta and the municipality of Emstek.

== Landscape ==
Visbek is the northernmost municipality in Vechta district, bordering the rural districts of Cloppenburg and Oldenburg. To the west, north and east of the village of Visbek, lies the long, narrow strip of the nature reserve of Streams of the Endel and Holzhausen Heath, with the geest brooks and wet lowlands of the Aue, Twillbäke and Visbeker Bruchbach streams with their associated watermills.

== Middle Ages ==
Historical tradition dates back as far as to the late 8th century, when upon order of the Frankish king Charlemagne (later Emperor Charles the Great), the abbey of Visbek - then called "cellula fiscbechi", under Abbot Gerbert Castus - played a major role in the Christianization of the newly conquered surrounding Saxon territories of Lerigau, Hasegau and Venkigau.

In 855 AD, King Louis the German allocated the Benedictine Abbey of Visbek in the shire of Lerigau, with its territories and possessions, to the Imperial Abbey of Corvey.

== Megalithic tombs ==
The Visbek region, however, had been populated even before the Middle Ages, in fact as far back as the Neolithic Period, as evinced by numerous megalithic tombs of the Funnelbeaker culture (3,500 - 2,800 BC) that may still be seen today. Examples - aside from the Heidenopfertisch illustrated below - include the large stone graves of Mühlensteine, Schmeersteine, Visbeker Braut and Visbeker Bräutigam.

== Media ==
The following regional newspapers are delivered in Visbek:

- Oldenburgische Volkszeitung, Vechta
- Nordwest-Zeitung, Oldenburg

== Economy ==
Several companies of the meat industry are located in Visbek. The PHW Group, the largest German poultry meat producer, has its headquarters in Rechterfeld. The EW Group, the world market leader in poultry breeding and genetics, also has its headquarters in Visbek. Additionally, the Plukon Food Group runs poultry meat processing facilities in Visbek.

== Regular festivities ==
- Every year at Pentecost, the Visbek Shooting Club, St. Hubertus, hosts its Schützenfest fun fair and folk processions.
- The annual Visbek Rockt open air music festival takes place at the end of May, featuring local and regional rock bands.

== Partner municipality ==
France A partnership with Pontvallain in the Sarthe Departement has been maintained since 1988.

== Gallery ==
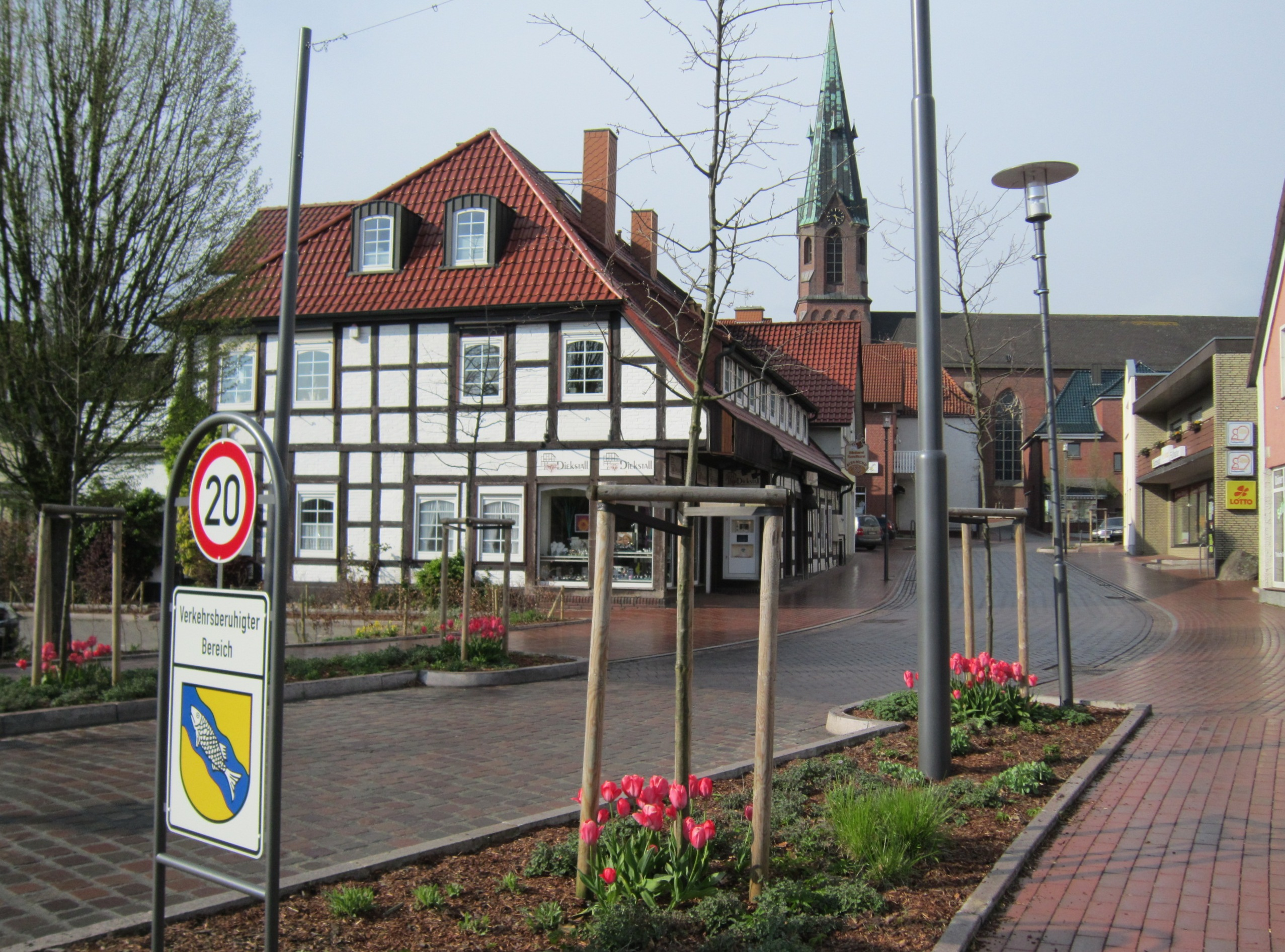
The high street (Hauptstraße) in Visbek

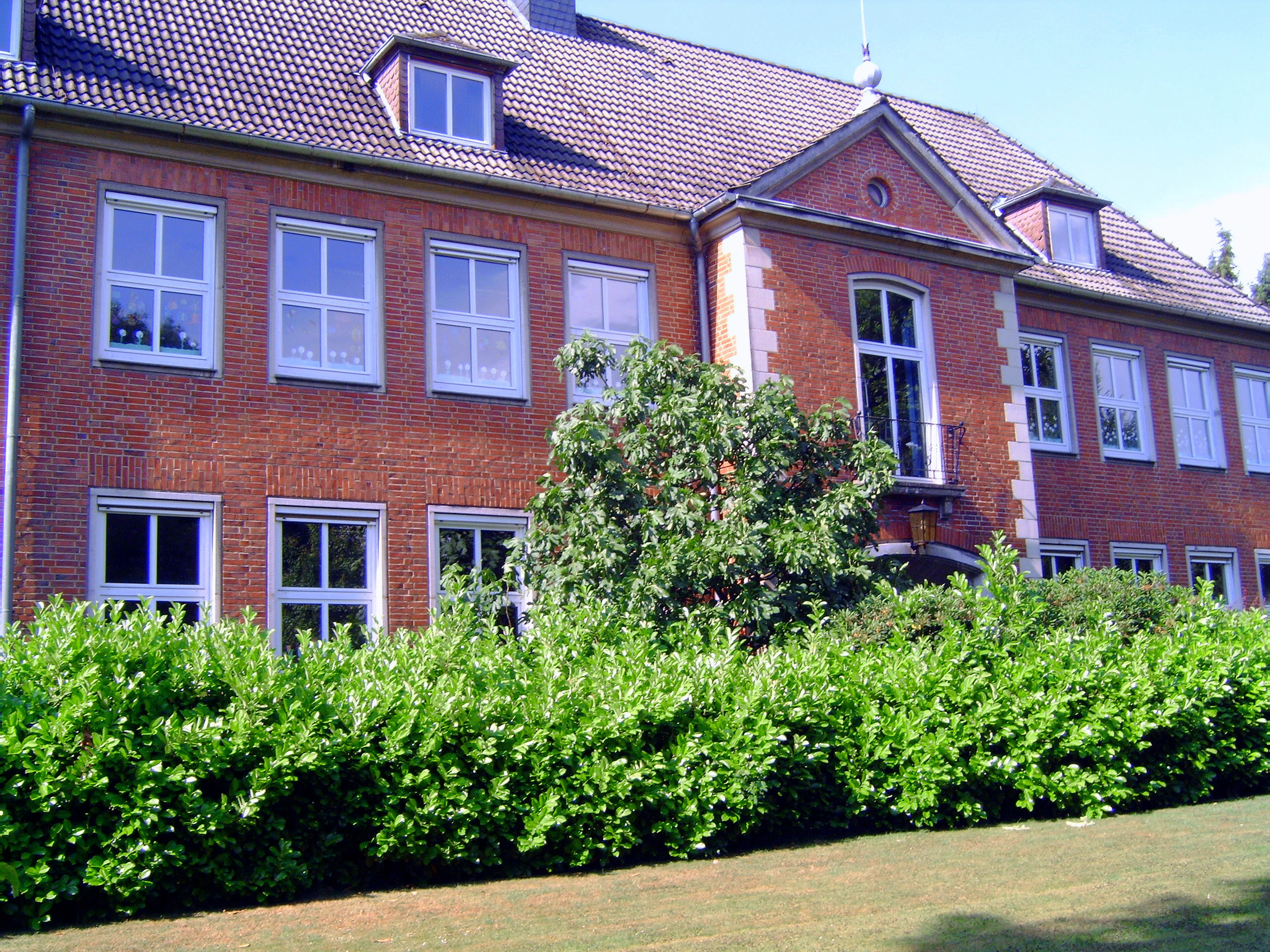
Gerbert Primary School, Visbek

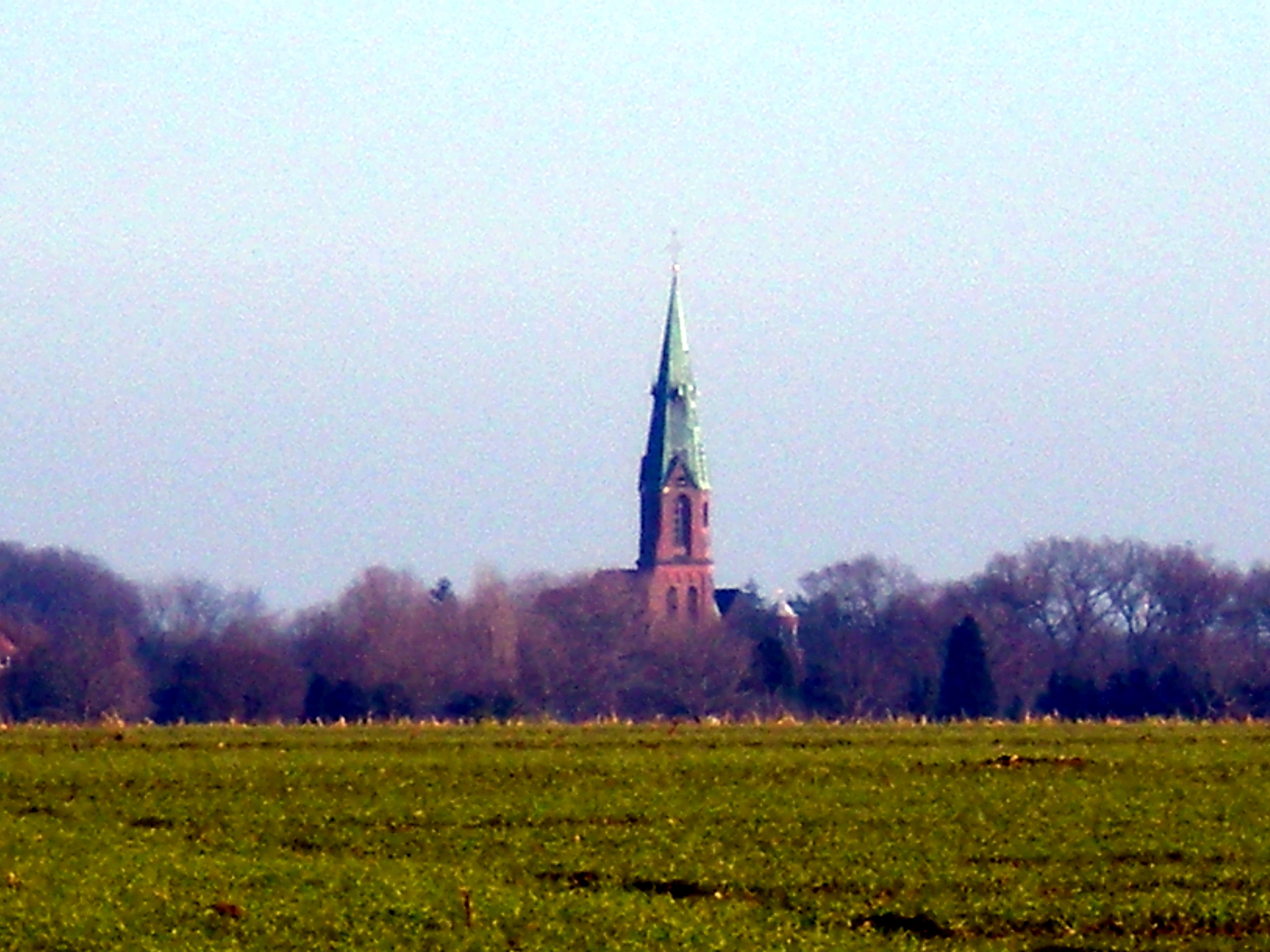
Roman Catholic St. Vitus Parish Church, Visbek, seen from the west

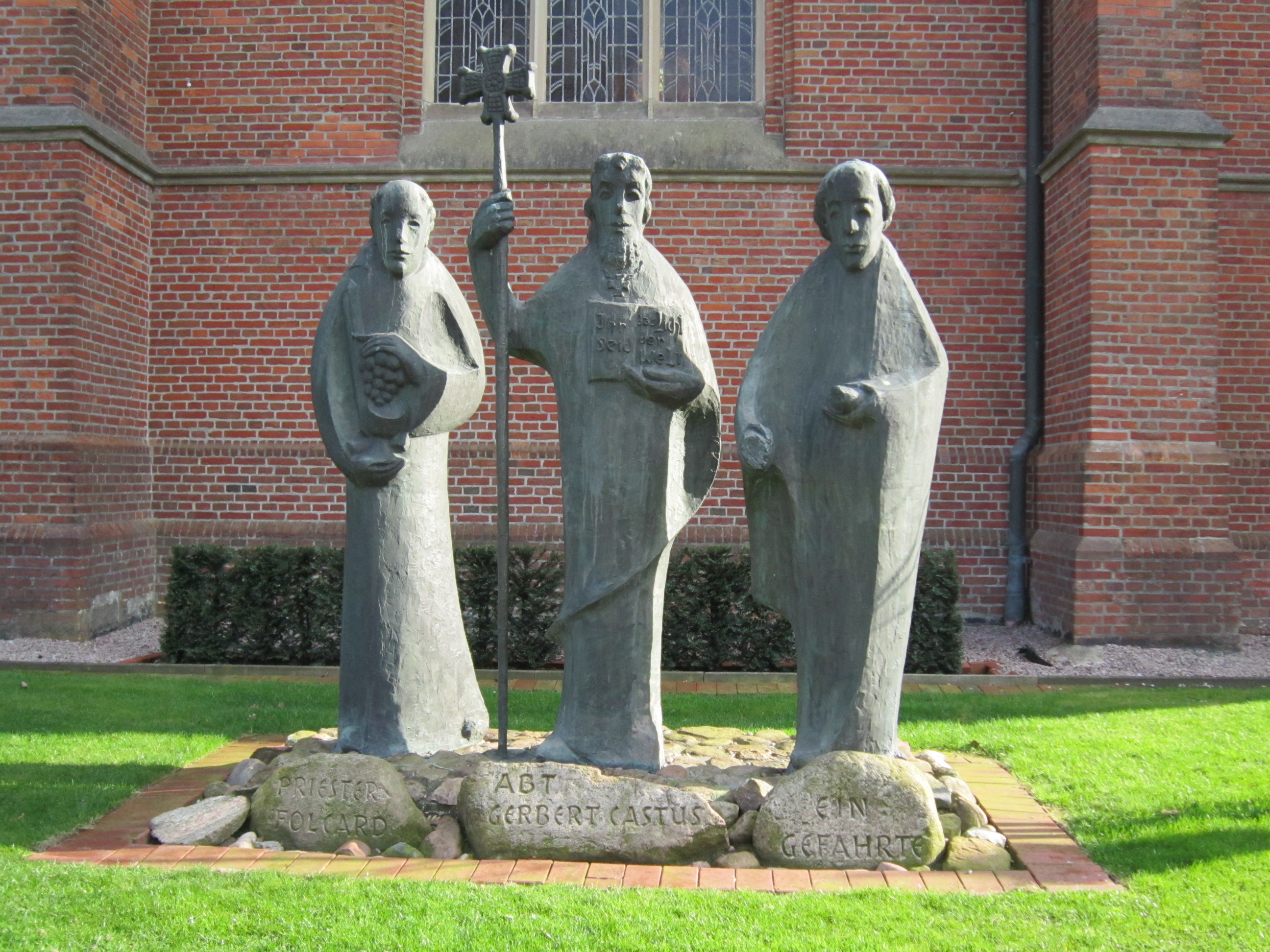
Abbot Gerbert Castus Monument at St. Vitus Church, Visbek

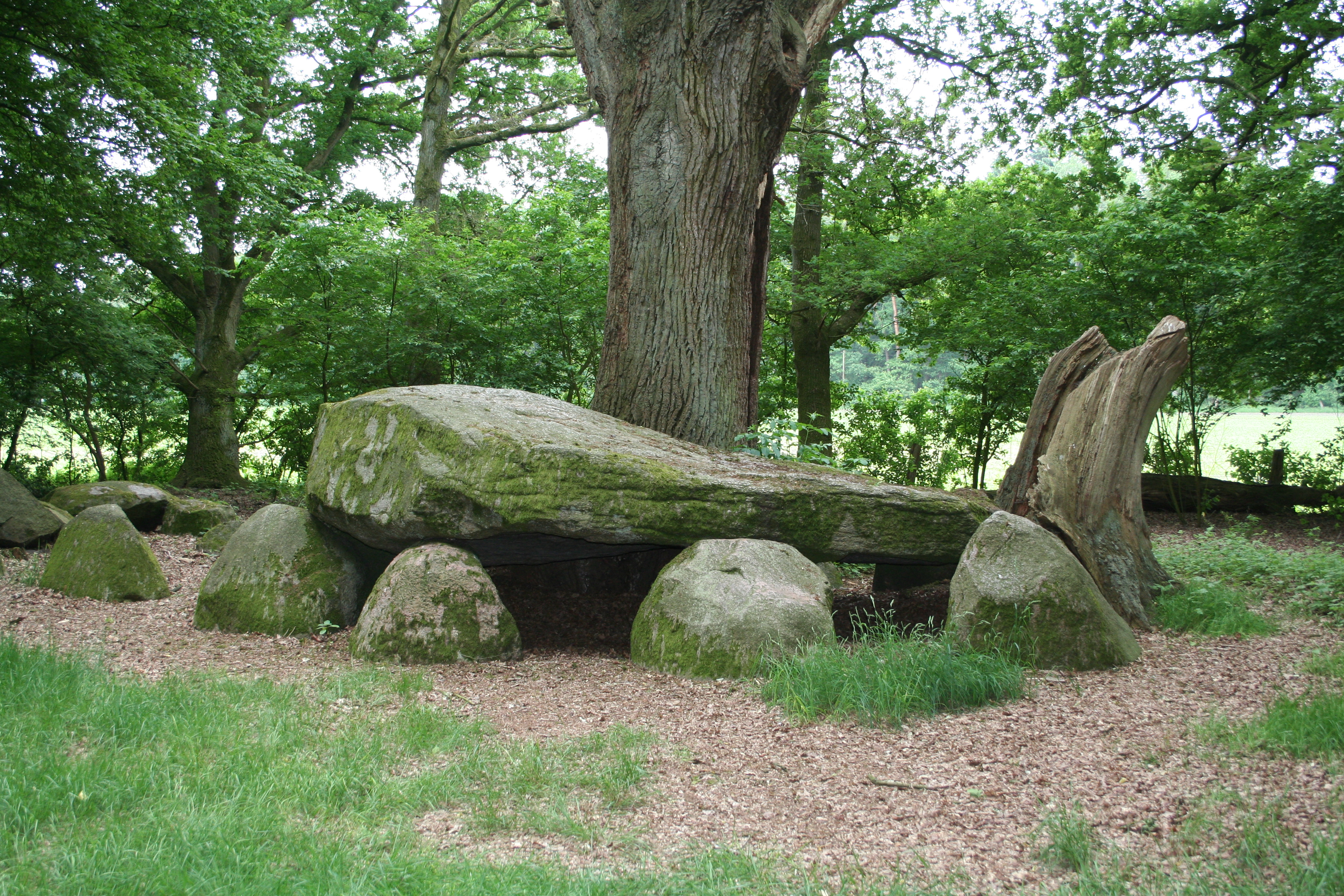
The Heidenopfertisch, a megalithic grave near Visbek at Engelmannsbäke

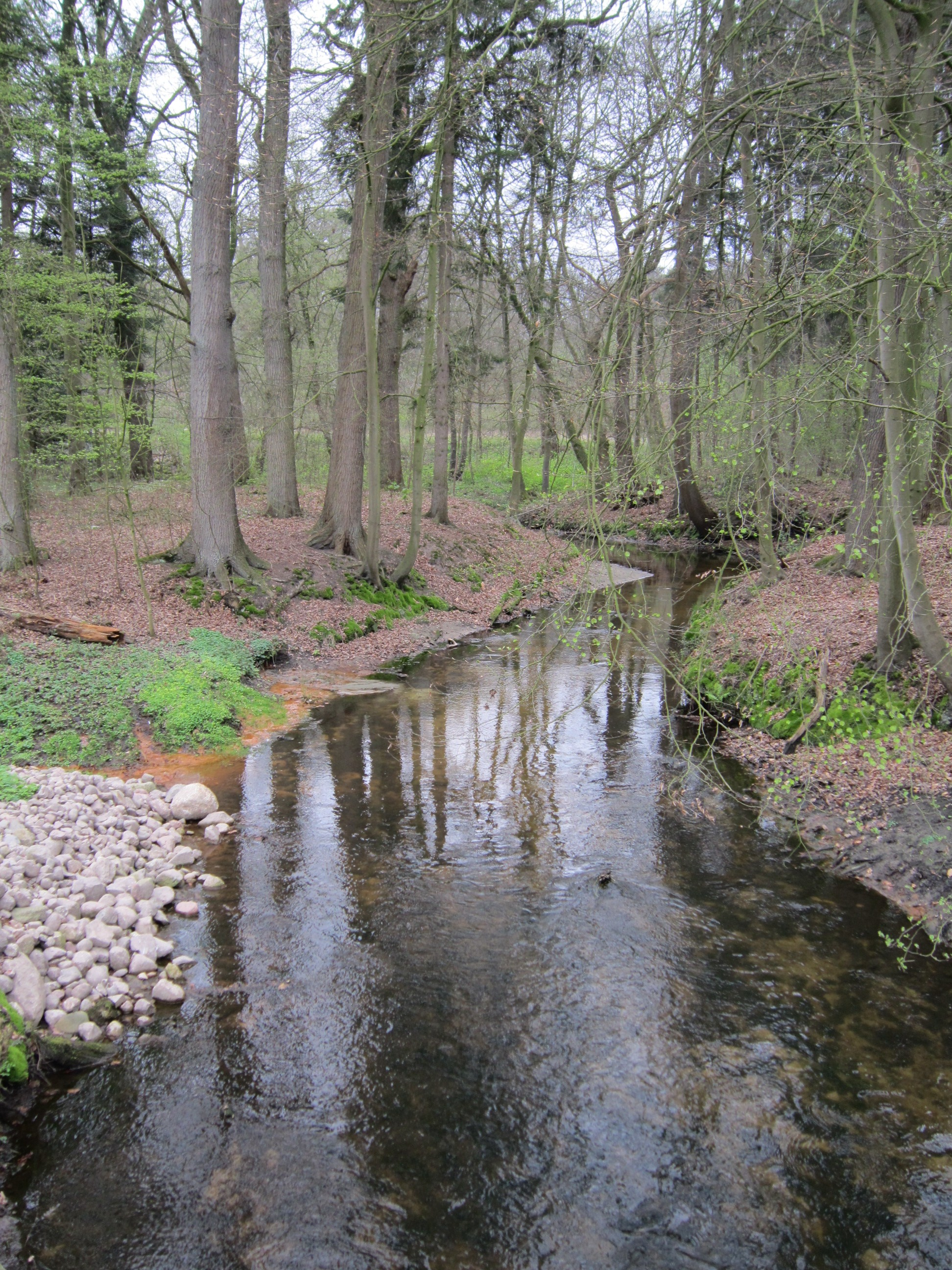
The Twillbäke stream, Bullmühle

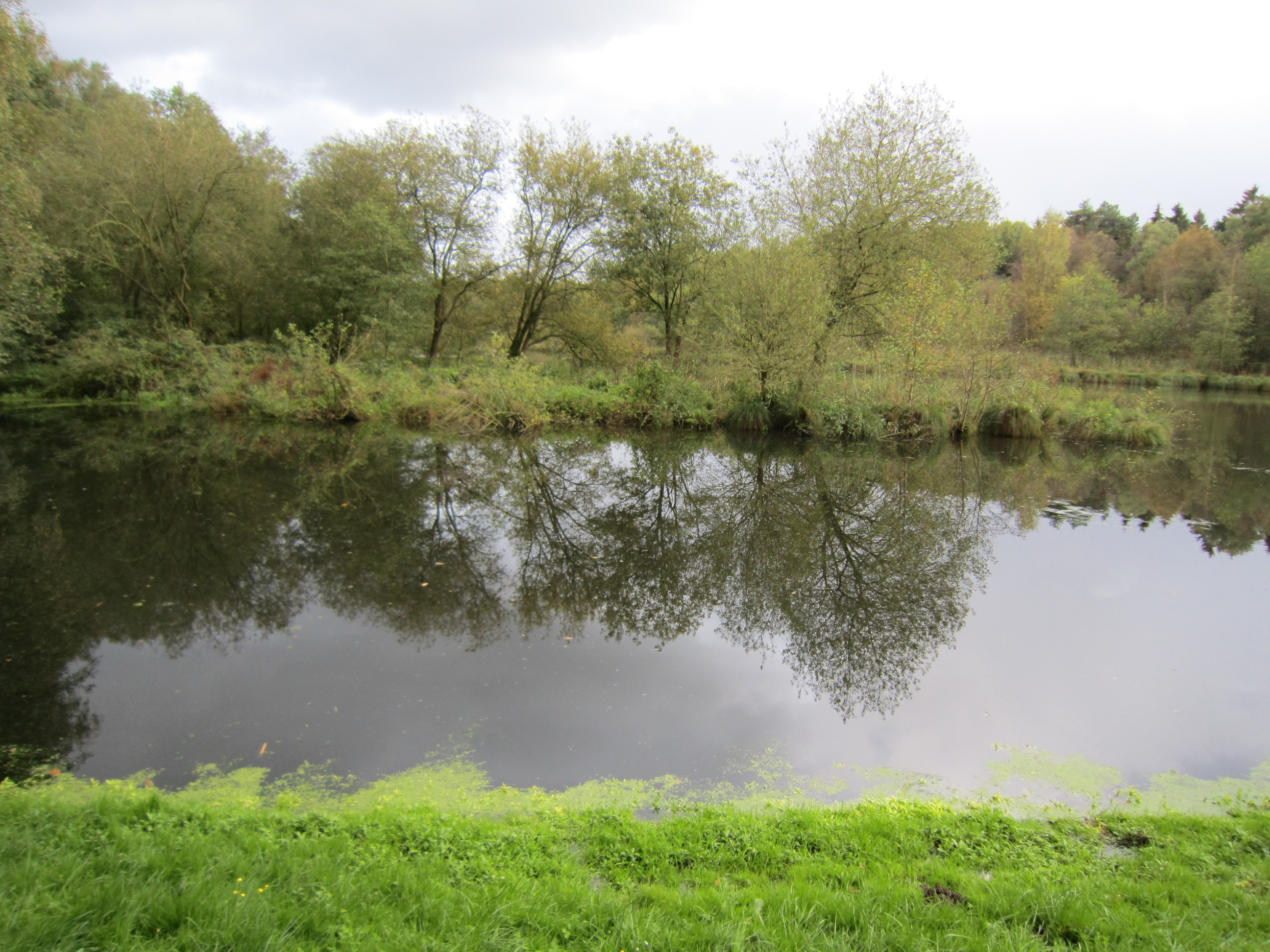
Mill pond of Twillbäke stream, Bullmühle

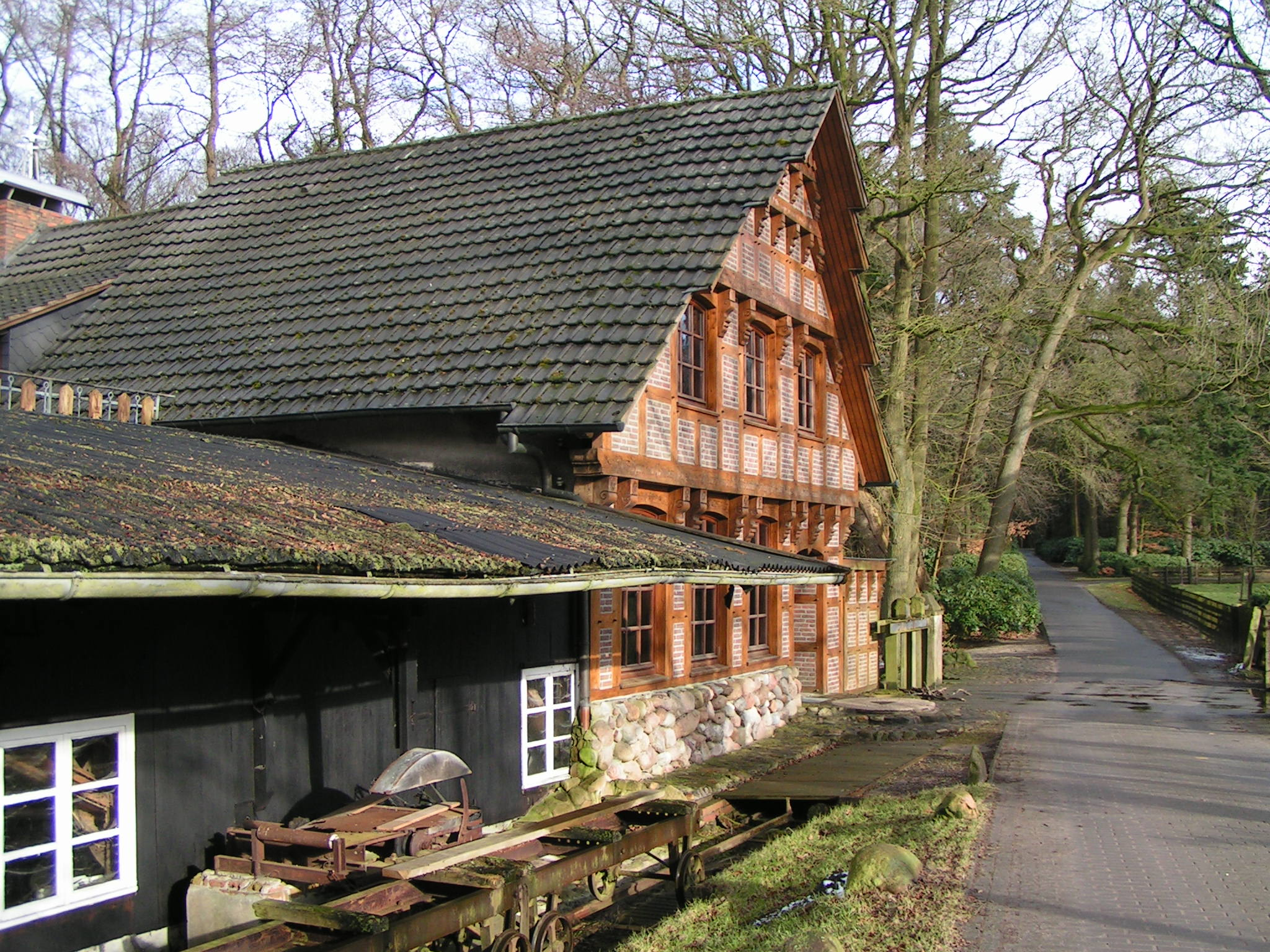
The Kokenmühle Watermill, Endel (Visbek)

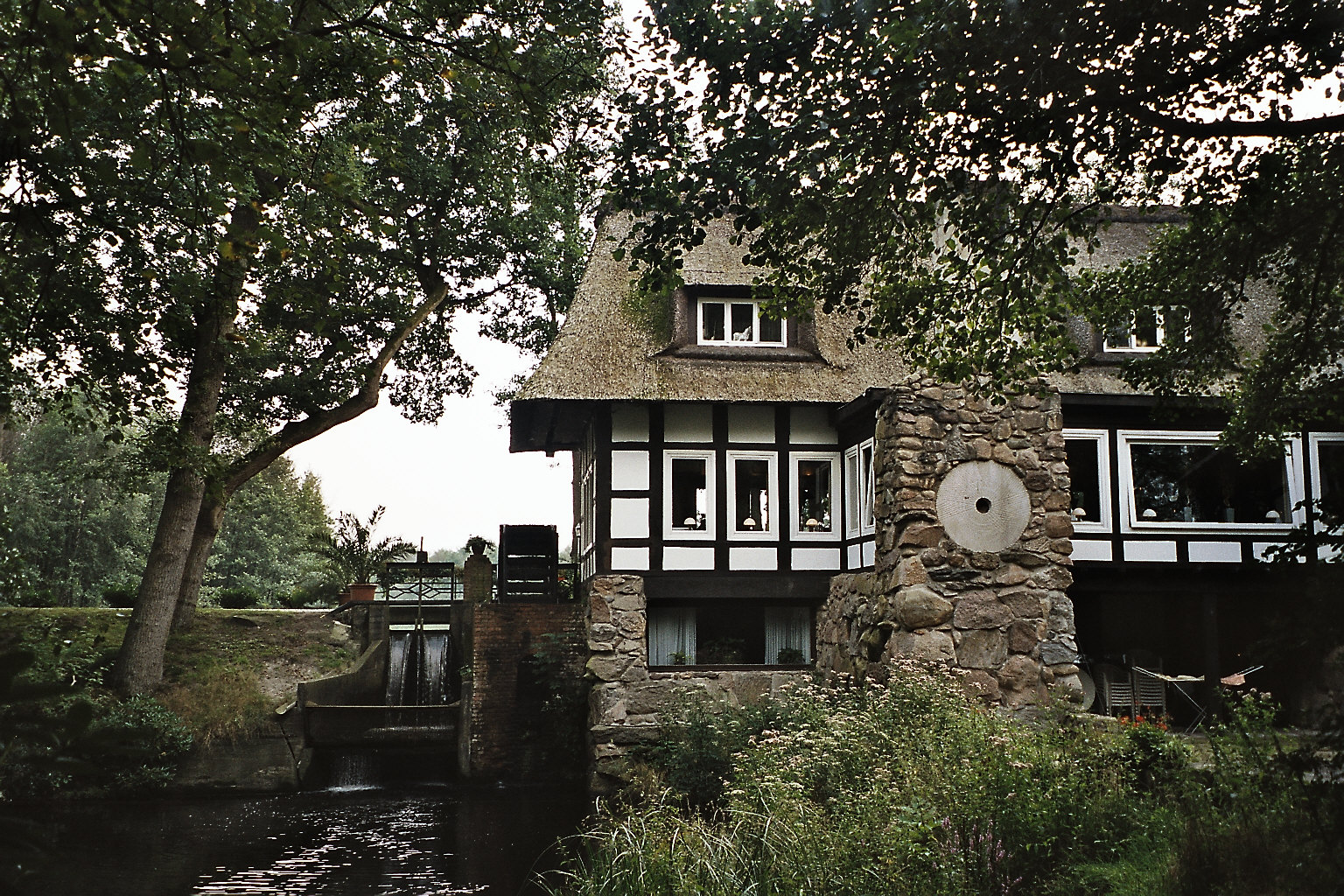
The Neumühle Watermill, Endel (Visbek)
