= Dinklage =

- Municipality
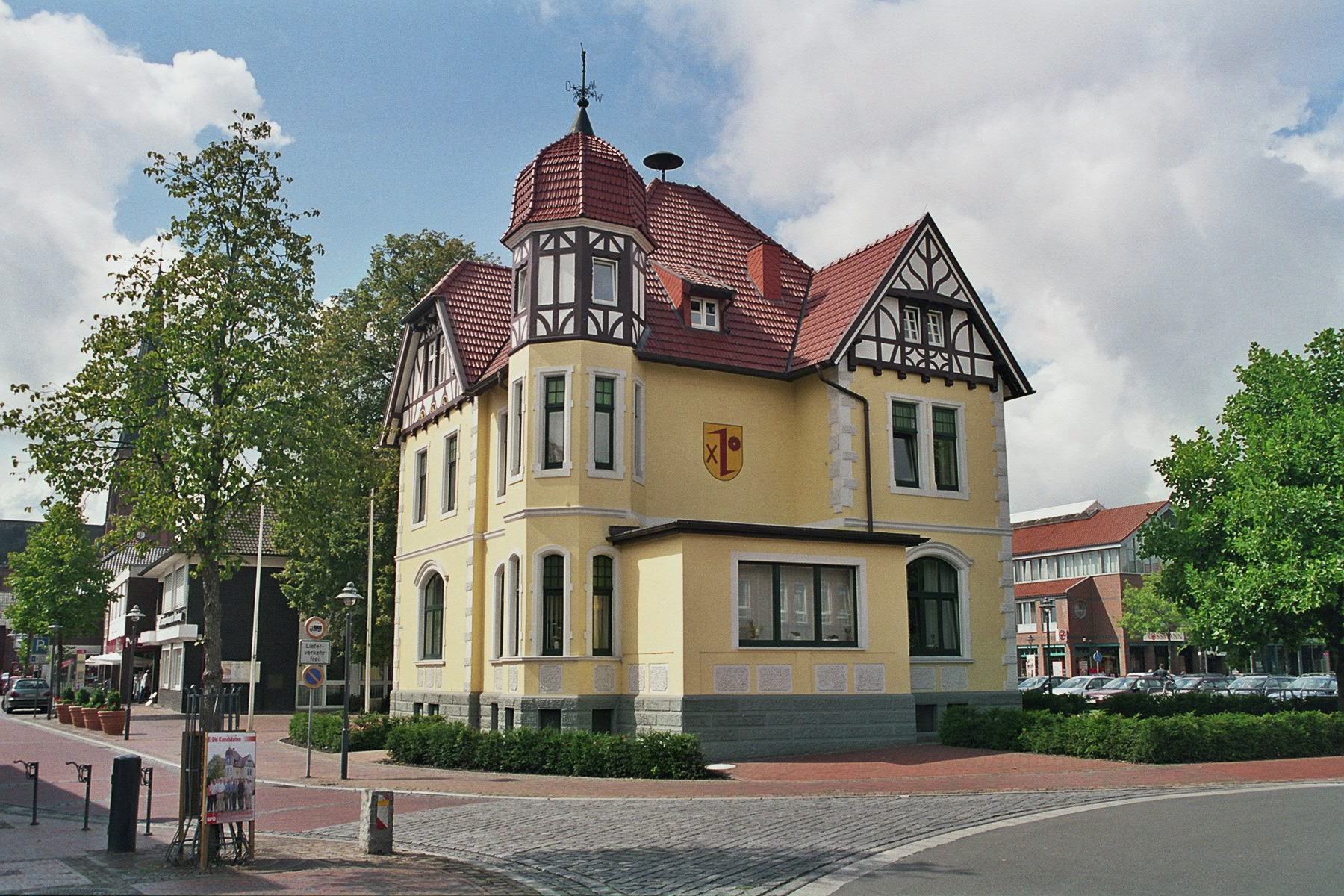

- Coat of arms

- Location of Dinklage within Vechta district
- Interactive map of Dinklage
- Location within Germany Location within Lower Saxony
- Coordinates: 52°40′N 8°8′E
- Country: Germany
- State: Lower Saxony
- District: Vechta
- Subdivisions: 6 districts

Government
  - Mayor (2021–26): Carl Heinz Putthoff (Ind.)

Area
  - Total: 72.8 km^{2} (28.1 sq mi)
- Elevation: 27 m (89 ft)

Population (2025-12-31)
  - Total: 13,547
  - Density: 186/km^{2} (482/sq mi)
- Time zone: UTC+01:00 (CET)
  - Summer (DST): UTC+02:00 (CEST)
- Postal codes: 49413
- Dialling codes: 04443
- Vehicle registration: VEC
- Website: www.dinklage.de

Dinklage (German pronunciation: [ˈdɪŋkˌlaːɡə]) is a town in the district of Vechta, in Lower Saxony, Germany. It is situated approximately 45 miles southwest of Bremen, and 30 miles north of Osnabrück.

== Geography ==
Dinklage is located in the North German Plain (Norddeutschen Tiefebene), within the so-called Dinklage Basin, an extensive lowland area approximately 60 miles south of the North Sea coast and about 40 miles east of the Dutch border, roughly midway between Bremen and Osnabrück.

To the east and northeast, beyond the municipal boundaries, there are extensive peatland areas (Südlohner Moor, Diepholzer Moor, and Goldenstedter Moor). To the northwest lies the Cloppenburger Geest, to the southeast the Dammer Berge (hills), to the west the Hasetal, and to southwest the Ankumer Höhe.

The municipal area is predominantly flat and slopes gently from southeast to northwest. The highest elevation, at about 105 ft above sea level, is located in the southern part of the municipality, in the rural district of Langwege near Federal Highway B 214. The lowest point, at 75 ft above sea level, lies in the northwest of the municipal area along the Lager Hase in the rural district of Wulfenau. The town center is situated at an elevation of approximately 85 to 92 ft above sea level. The landscape is characterized by rows of trees and hedgerows, which give structure to the area.

=== Surface water ===
Several lowland streams (creeks) flow near Dinklage from the right into the brook Dinklager Mühlenbach – from south to north these are the brook Trenkampsbach, the brook Dinkel, and the brook Hopener Mühlenbach. The brook Dinklager Mühlenbach flows northward to the municipal boundary of Dinklage, where it joins the stream Aue, a boundary stream also flowing in from the east, to form the stream Lager Hase. Via the Hase river and the Ems river, the water ultimately drains into the North Sea. From the left, the brook Bünner Bach flows into the brook Dinklage Mühlenbach.

The brook Handorfer Mühlenbach, flowing from the southeast from the rural district of Langwege, discharges into the canal Bünne–Wehdel Grenzkanal, which forms the western boundary of Dinklage and thus of the Vechta district. This canal flows into the canal Essener Kanal, a branch of the inland Hase delta, which merges with the river Lager Hase west of the town of Essen (Oldb). Part of the surface water from Dinklage drains north of Quakenbrück via the Lager Hase river, while another part flows via the boundary canal and the Essener Kanal into the Große Hase river. Via the lower reaches of the Hase river and the Ems river, the water eventually reaches the North Sea.

==== Stream restoration and flood protection ====
- Hopener Mühlenbach: The creek was ecologically stressed for a long time; in 2009 its condition was assessed as “moderate.” Since 2013, continuous restoration measures have been implemented, including the installation of large woody debris, gravel, a riffle structure to improve longitudinal connectivity, and more dynamic flow patterns, all of which have enhanced habitat quality.
- Dinklage Mühlenbach & Aue: These watercourses exhibit significant ecological deficits and have been rated as being in poor condition, with substantial losses in ecological quality. Designated floodplain areas have been established to reduce flood risks.

=== Peatlands and other wetlands ===
The "Burgwald Dinklage" is a designated nature reserve (NSG WE 291) covering approximately 126 hectares. In addition to drier oak–beech forest, the area includes moist and groundwater-influenced zones with wet woodland and small water bodies. These habitats support amphibians such as the protected great crested newt. The "Burgwald Dinklage" is not a classic peat bog with extensive peat deposits, but rather a near-natural forest and wetland area featuring small ponds, wet forest, and localized wet biotopes.

The "Bockhorster Moor" is designated as a landscape protection area within the district of Vechta (LSG VEC 00075). In the southern part of the "Bockhorster Moor", at least two ponds are documented as habitats for amphibians and insects (e.g. dragonflies) and as hunting grounds for birds such as the kingfisher. Owing to its water bodies, wet areas, and riparian vegetation, the site offers strong potential for biodiversity. Amphibians, dragonflies, birds, and other water- and moisture-dependent species are known or expected to occur in the area.

=== Subsurface conditions ===
The subsurface in the Dinklage area consists predominantly of glaciofluvial sediments from the Pleistocene, mainly loamy and sandy deposits. Borehole investigations have shown that the upper soil layer is approximately 16 – 20 ft thick. Beneath this lies a roughly 33 ft thick layer of loamy and marl-bearing sediments.

=== Groundwater conditions ===
The Dinklage area lies in a landscape shaped by past ice ages. The ground consists mainly of loose sediments such as sand and clay. Sandy layers can store and transmit groundwater well. Usable groundwater is found close to the surface (about 6 – 20 ft deep). Deeper sandy layers at around 80 – 100 ft also provide good groundwater resources. Clay and loam layers allow little water to pass through and act as natural barriers, while sandy layers let groundwater flow more easily.

Since 2017, the Burgwald Dinklage has been under formal protection. However, the site’s water balance remains critical, as development pressure and the isolation of the biotope by commercial and industrial areas threaten groundwater levels and ecological connectivity.

=== Climate ===
Dinklage has a temperate maritime climate influenced by moist northwesterly winds from the North Sea, characterized by mild winters, warm summers, and moderate precipitation evenly distributed throughout the year. Summers are often dry and sunny, while snowfall occasionally occurs in winter.

In 2023, the average annual temperature was 11.2 °C and shows an upward trend. Over the past ten years, the average temperature was 10.6 °C, while the long-term average over the past 100 years was 9.2 °C. Between May and August, an average of 20–25 summer days can be expected (a climatological term referring to days on which the maximum temperature exceeds 25 °C).

Depending on measurement methods and definitions, the area receives approximately 1,627 to 2,275 hours of sunshine per year. The average annual precipitation for the period 2012–2021 was 528 mm.

== History ==
=== Middle Ages ===
King Heinrich I (916–936) founded a mounted army that developed into a group of knights. Moated castles were built to provide refuge in times of war. The Dersgau Count of Calvelage (today Brockdorf) built a castle at Dinklage around 980. The builder may have been named Ferdinand.

- Count Bernhard I – 980
- Count Hermann I – 1020
- Count Bernhard II – 1051
- Count Hermann II married Ethelinde, daughter of the heroic Otto of Nordheim, in 1075. The sphere of influence shifted northward and she wanted a larger, more magnificent castle, so they moved to Vechta around 1080. He left the castle to his vassals, who then called themselves the "Lords of Dincklage" (Herren von Dinklage).

The settlement of Dinklage was first documented in 1231 in connection with the family named “Lords of Dincklage" ("Herren von Dincklage", Thinclage, later Dynclage and finally Dinklage). Bertram von Dincklage and his sons Johannes and Bertram initially served as ministeriales to the Counts of Ravensberg-Vechta and became vassals of the Bishop of Münster in 1252. In the 14th century, the family rose to become the leading noble house in the region.

Southeast of the settlement, a motte-and-bailey castle (tower hill castle), the Ferdinandsburg, was probably constructed in the 13th century; the exact date of its construction is unknown.

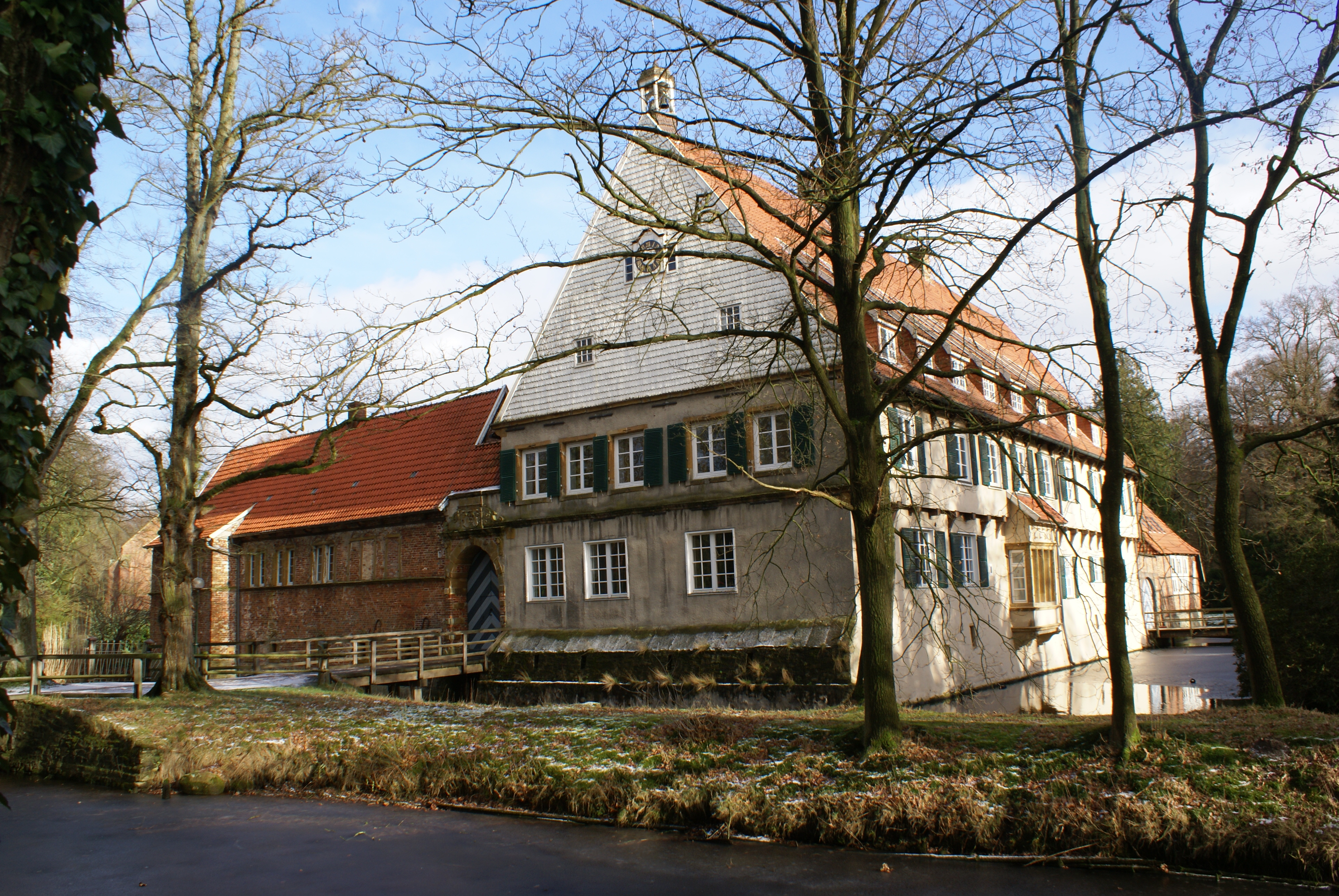
Dinklage Castle (Dietrichsburg)

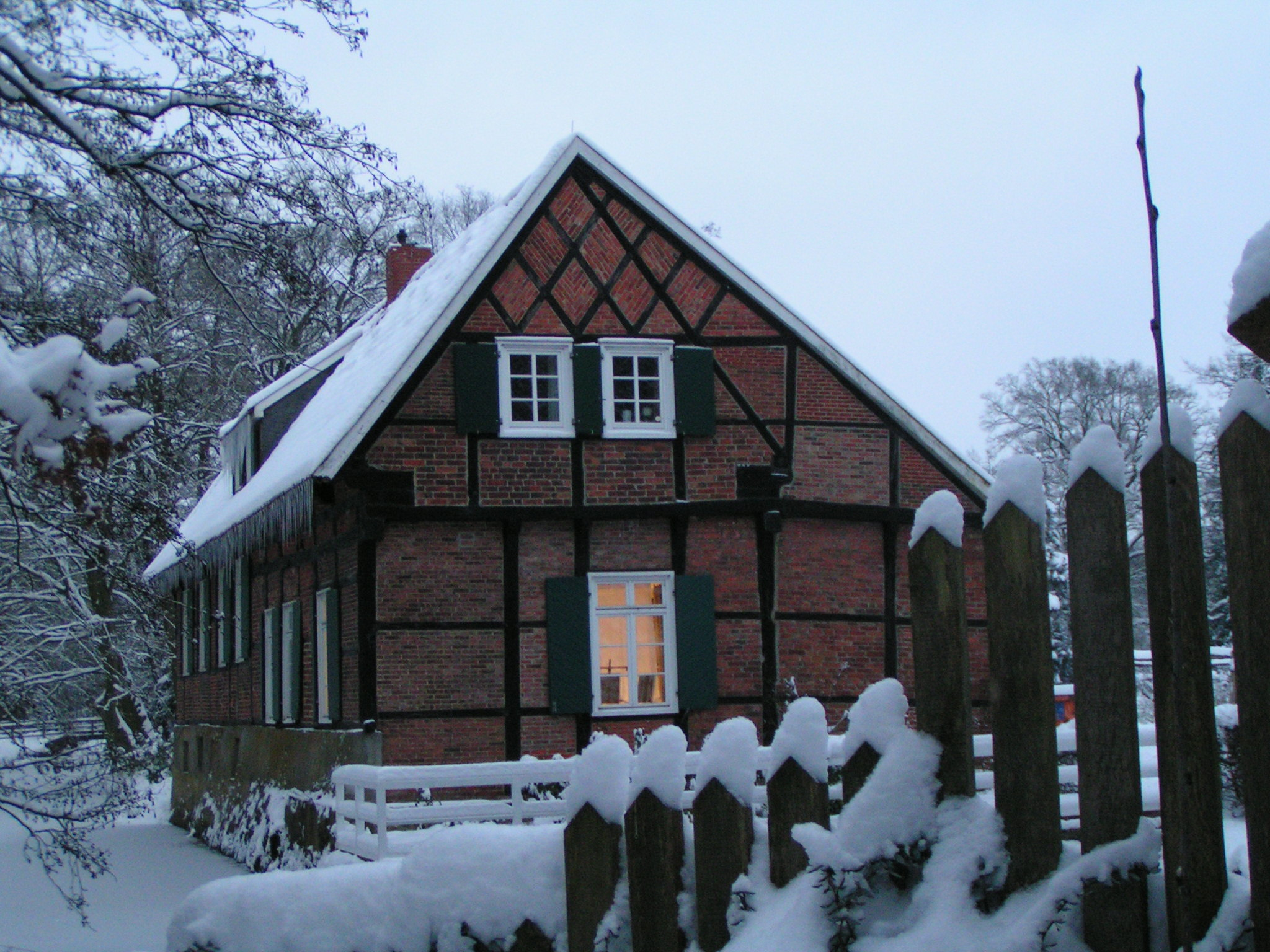
The former rent office (on the site of the Herbordsburg)

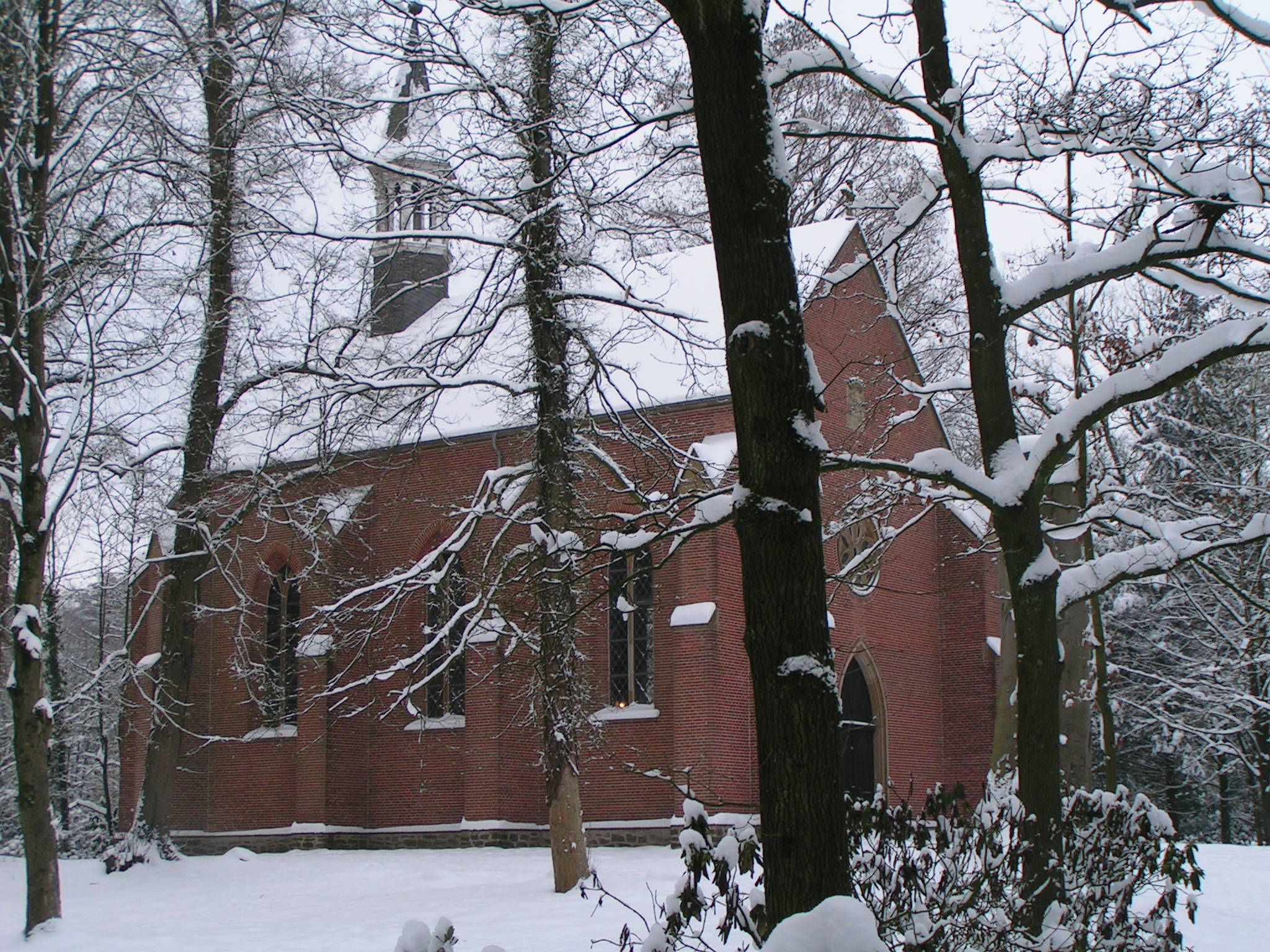
The castle chapel (on the site of the Hugoburg)

Around 1372, the Lords of Dincklage attempted to establish their own territorial lordship. This led to conflicts with the Bishop of Münster, who had their castle destroyed in 1374. As a result of an inheritance division, four new castles were built by around 1400: the Hugoburg (Hugo Castle), the Herbordsburg (Herbord Castle), the Dietrichsburg (Dietrich Castle), and the Johannsburg (John Castle). Of these, only the Dietrichsburg survives today, although in a later architectural style. The former Herbordsburg (demolished by 1677) and Hugoburg (demolished by 1840) are commemorated only by the former rent office (on the site of the Herbordsburg) and the castle chapel (on the site of the Hugoburg). The location of the Johannsburg is unknown.

On 4 June 1349, the first church in the settlement was consecrated, Dinklage was elevated to an independent parish, and it was separated from the mother parish of Lohne.

The region was affected by outbreaks of plague in 1360 and 1380.

=== Early modern period ===
Further plague epidemics occurred during the 16th and 17th centuries.

Johann von Dincklage, a prominent member of the Lords of Dincklage, supported Martin Luther’s Reformation in 1543, leading a large proportion of Dinklage’s inhabitants to adopt the Protestant faith.

In 1575, a devastating fire destroyed numerous houses and buildings in Dinklage.

By 1588, the Lords of Dincklage were facing severe financial difficulties. Against this background, Magdalene von Dincklage married Caspar von Ledebur. Through this marriage, the Dietrichsburg passed by inheritance into the possession of the Ledebur family. After her husband’s death in 1597, Magdalene von Dincklage-Ledebur continued the expansion of the Dietrichsburg. In 1614, she commissioned the construction of a barn that today serves as the church of the Benedictine community.

During the Thirty Years’ War (1618–1648), marauding Protestant troops under the command of Count Mansfeld invaded the region in 1622. From the autumn of 1623 until the spring of 1630, Dinklage was occupied by foreign troops. When the occupiers withdrew, the church was left in a state of severe disrepair.

In 1641, the Bishop of Münster, Christoph Bernhard von Galen, sent his trusted associate Johann Heinrich von Galen to Dinklage, appointing him Drost (district administrator) of the Vechta district and granting him the corresponding authority. As the town of Vechta was still occupied by Swedish troops, von Galen took up residence at Dinklage Castle, leasing the Dietrichsburg from Caspar von Ledebur. From there, he worked to regain control of and consolidate the Vechta district.

After the end of the Thirty Years’ War in 1648, the Counter-Reformation, originally initiated in 1613, was resumed, despite resistance from the majority of the population. By the end of his tenure as Prince-Bishop of Münster in 1678, Christoph Bernhard von Galen had almost completely re-Catholicized the Lower Bishopric of Münster, to which Dinklage then belonged. In the same year, the church was restored under the direction of the Counts of Galen.

=== The von Galen family ===
In 1667, Prince-Bishop Christoph Bernhard von Galen assumed control of the Dinklage estates of the impoverished Dincklage-Ledebur family on behalf of his brother Johann Heinrich von Galen, Drost of the Vechta district. This step was taken in response to an inheritance dispute within the Ledebur family. In this context, Christoph Bernhard placed the estate under compulsory administration by his brother. The Ledebur family contested this measure in court; an amicable settlement with the heirs of Clemens August Baron von Galen was not reached until 1801.

The von Galen family subsequently transferred their residence to Dinklage, taking up residence in the Dietrichsburg. The Herbordsburg was used as a warehouse, while the Hugoburg functioned as a storage facility, courthouse, and prison. In 1677, Dinklage was elevated to the status of a so-called Herrlichkeit—an imperial territory with its own administration and jurisdiction under the authority of the von Galen family. However, feudal obligations to the Bishopric of Münster prevented full sovereignty. As early as 1665, members of the von Galen family were entitled to bear the title of Imperial Barons, and they served as Drosten of the Vechta district until 1803.

With the Imperial Recess (Reichsdeputationshauptschluss) of 25 February 1803, the ecclesiastical principalities were dissolved, and Dinklage, together with the districts of Cloppenburg and Vechta, passed to the Duchy of Oldenburg. In 1826, Matthias Graf von Galen and the Oldenburg government councillor Carl Friedrich Ferdinand Suden signed a treaty formally abolishing the Herrlichkeit of Dinklage.

The most prominent member of the von Galen family was Clemens August Graf von Galen, Bishop of Münster and later a cardinal. He was born at Burg Dinklage (Dinklage Castle) in 1878 and spent his childhood there. In the 1980s, following the insolvency of the SMH Bank and the family's involvement in it, the von Galen family lost their last remaining properties in Dinklage.

=== French period ===
In 1810, Napoleon’s troops occupied the Duchy of Oldenburg and thus also Dinklage. In 1811, Dinklage was incorporated into the French Empire and became part of the Arrondissement of Quakenbrück in the Department of the Upper Ems.

Together with the parishes of the neighbor villages Lohne and Steinfeld, Dinklage formed the Canton of Dinklage, with its seat in Dinklage. The former parish bailiff Johann Conrad Böckmann was appointed mayor (maire) of the town. French law, a new administrative structure, and the French judicial system were introduced.

In Dinklage, the justice of the peace court (Friedensgericht) was located in the administrative building (Amtshaus). Records were kept in French and the local language Low German (Plattdeutsch). Modern civil institutions replaced the feudal structures. Serfdom was abolished by the French government (and later reintroduced by the Duke of Oldenburg).

To finance the Grande Armée, the population was heavily taxed. Citizens of Dinklage paid various taxes and levies. In addition, the community had to supply livestock, grain, and fodder for the troops and provide financial support for a French honor guard. Citizens from the Canton of Dinklage were required to perform military service in the Napoleonic troops and to take part in the Russian campaign. On August 28, 1811, the Arrondissement of Quakenbrück provided a contingent of 303 men for the French army, 30 of whom came from the Canton of Dinklage.

=== Oldenburg period ===
- In 1813, the Duke of Oldenburg returned from exil and reinstated the previously abolished system of serfdom (bondage).
- In 1827, Dinklage became part of the Grand Duchy of Oldenburg as the last locality of the Oldenburger Münsterland region. As successors to the Prince-Bishops of Münster, the Grand Dukes of Oldenburg exercised sovereignty over Dinklage.
- Between 1848 and 1849, the Schwege Mill (Schweger Mühle) was built on land owned by the Schulte zu Ostendorf family.
- Around 1850, serfdom ended in Dinklage, as it did throughout the Grand Duchy of Oldenburg. The now free farmers were able to redeem their farms from the landlords by paying monetary compensation.
- In 1852, the Protestant church was built in the rural district of Wulfenau.

==== Industrialisation ====
The Wiek, northeastern part of Dinklage, which was already the industrial centre of the parish in the time of the Herren of Dinklage, also developed into a significant regional centre for trade. Theoder Hörstmann (Contribution to the History S. 42) describes Dinklage in 1837: it lists four distilleries (schnapps), eight breweries, five oil mills, a tobacco factory, one candle factory, three grain mills, 21 merchants and grocers, as well as 223 craftsmen, of whom 85 were rope weavers. The industries began as family businesses and contracted for additional workers, and became known as factories.

The rapid population growth led to mechanization, initially in the weaving trade. The van der Wal brothers from the Netherlands planned a weaving and printing mill on the Mühlenbach stream. In 1837, they submitted an application to the authorities. Despite resistance from Vechta, a dyer from Vechta and a calico manufacturer from Bakum were granted permission.

Another pioneer of industrialization in the second half of the century was the miller and wagon builder Bernhard Holthaus. He benefited from the modernization of agriculture. His machines were sold throughout the country and led to the establishment of a factory for agricultural equipment—one of the largest enterprises in the duchy in the 19th century.

==== First local parliament ====
The first local parliament was established on 1 May 1856. The members of parliament were Mr Renze zu Bahlen (farmer), Mr Többe-Schwegmann (farmer), Mr Klöcker (farmer), Mr Brunkenkel (farmer), Mr Hörstmann (innkeeper), Mr Diers-Bünnemeyer (farmer), Mr Böckmann (farmer), Mr Sextro (farmer), Mr Schulte (farmer), Mr Hörstmann (farmer), Mr Meyer (farmer), Mr Bornorst (farmer), Mr Niemann (farmer), Mr Hugo (farmer), and Mr Keppel (pharmacist). Johann Ostendorf served as parliamentary head.

==== Emigration ====
In the 19th century, widespread poverty among day laborers and tenant farmers led to rural depopulation, and many inhabitants of Dinklage emigrated to North America. They settled mainly in the U.S. states of Ohio, Kansas, Michigan, Wisconsin, Kentucky, Missouri, New York, and Illinois. For example, many of the family of Von Fricken moved to Kings County, NY, Brooklyn, Troy, NY and to Long Island, NY.

=== German Empire ===
During the period of the German Empire (Deutsches Kaiserreich, 1871–1918), Dinklage was an agriculturally oriented settlement within the Grand Duchy of Oldenburg. The population grew slightly, but further emigration to North America took place.

- Between 1875 and 1878, the present Catholic church (St. Catharina) was built and consecrated in 1884.
- During this period, the school system was built and expanded in cooperation with the Catholic Church, and Catholic elementary schools were established in Dinklage.
- From around 1880 onwards, numerous associations and clubs (Vereine) were founded, including sports clubs, shooting clubs, choral societies, and the Kolping Association.
- In 1904, Dinklage was connected to the network of the German Railway System via the Lohne–Dinklage railway line. The representative station building at the terminus northwest of the town center—now known as the Old Station—was completed in 1907. The line was closed in 2002.

=== Weimar Republic ===
- Between 1919 and 1933, Dinklage belonged to the Free State of Oldenburg.
- As early as 17 November 1918, a workers’ and soldiers’ council was established in Dinklage.
- In March 1919, the first democratic elections to the National Assembly were held; in Dinklage, many votes went to the Catholic Zentrumspartei.
- The first free municipal council elections in Dinklage took place on 16 April 1919.
- After the First World War, further emigration occurred due to wartime experiences, economic hardship, and political instability. Many emigrants moved to Brazil, particularly to the southern states of Paraná, Santa Catarina, and Rio Grande do Sul.

=== National Socialist period ===
In the last Reichstag elections on 5 March 1933, the NSDAP received just under 6 percent of the vote in Dinklage. After the Nazi seizure of power, membership and support for the party increased locally. Other political parties were eliminated, and in 1938 the NSDAP appointed a loyalist from northern Oldenburg as mayor.

- The Catholic Church, represented by the Vechta officialdom and by the Bishop of Münster, Clemens August Graf von Galen, who originated from Dinklage, assumed a mediating role.
- During the Nazi dictatorship, Eastern European forced workers were employed at the B. Holthaus Maschinenfabrik AG (1850–1955), which the regime designated a “National Socialist model enterprise.”
- From 1941 to 1945, Benedictines nuns from the Vinnenberg Abbey in Warendorf, who had been expelled by the Nazis, found refuge at Burg Dinklage. They returned to Warendorf after the war.
- In 1943, Ferdinand van der Wal, who was born in Dinklage, was murdered in the Sachsenhausen concentration camp, where the SS classified him as a prisoner under Paragraph 175.
- According to the Arolsen Archives, suspected forced workers from Russia and Poland were buried in the Catholic cemetery in Dinklage in 1942 and 1943; the circumstances of their deaths are unknown.

Dinklage remained largely undamaged during the Second World War. In 1945, however several buildings in the town center were destroyed by rocket fire from advancing British army. No ground combat took place in the town.

=== Post-War period ===
- After 1945, Dinklage took in numerous displaced persons from the former East German provinces Silesia, East Prussia, and Pomerania; at times, they accounted for around 30 percent of the population. In the 1950s, new residential areas and many new buildings were constructed. Street names such as Königsberger Straße, Glatzer Straße, and Breslauer Straße commemorate this immigration.
- In 1949, Christoph Bernhard Graf von Galen donated the moated castle (Dietrichsburg) to the Benedictine order. Since then, it has been known as Dinklage Abbey.
- Between 1951 and 1952, the Protestant Trinity Church was built in Dinklage.

=== 20th and 21st centuries ===
Since around 1990—particularly between 1995 and 2000—Dinklage has experienced strong population growth. In 1995, Dinklage was granted town status ("Stadtrechte"), followed by comprehensive urban redevelopment.

In August 2002, Deutsche Bahn removed the connecting switch of the Lohne–Dinklage railway line, permanently closing the route. Passenger services had already ceased in 1954, and public freight transport ended in 1999. On 15 December 2003, the Dinklage town council formally resolved to dissolve the small railway operation. Large parts of the former railway line were subsequently converted into a high-speed cycle route between Dinklage and Lohne.

== Religion ==
From 1543 onward, Dinklage was initially shaped by Protestant Christianity after the population adopted the teachings of Martin Luther. Since the Counter-Reformation in the 17th century, Catholicism has been the dominant denomination in the region.

In 2025, approximately 13,600 people lived in the town. Of these, about 56% were Roman Catholic, 15% Protestant, and around 29% belonged to no denomination or to another religious affiliation.

In recent years, the number of people leaving the churches has increased significantly, and many residents now no longer belong to a Christian denomination.

=== Christianity ===
Christian churches in the town:

- Roman Catholic Parish of St. Catharina, Dinklage
- Evangelical Lutheran Parish of Dinklage and Wulfenau
- Benedictine Abbey of Burg Dinklage

As a result of immigration from Russia, Greece, and other Eastern and Southeastern European countries, Eastern Orthodox Christians are also present in the town.

=== Islam ===
Due in particular to immigration from the Balkans, Turkey, the Near and Middle East, and other regions, residents of the Islamic faith also live in Dinklage.

== Politics and governance ==
=== City Council ===
The City Council of Dinklage consists of 24 council members. The council members are elected every five years as part of the local elections. The legislative term of the currently elected City Council began on 1 November 2021 and ends on 31 October 2026.

The most recent local election on 12 September 2021 resulted in the following outcome in the town of Dinklage:

- CDU: 53.77% – 13 seats
- SPD: 14.96% – 4 seats
- Bürgerforum Dinklage (BFD): 17.83% – 4 seats
- Bündnis 90/ Die Grünen: 8.99% – 2 seats
- AfD: 4.45% – 1 seat

The full-time mayor, Carl Heinz Putthoff (independent), is a voting member of the council.

=== Mayorality ===
The first municipal council of Dinklage began its work on 1 May 1856. The first full-time mayor of the town of Dinklage was Heinrich Moormann, who took office in 2001.

Municipal heads before 1945 (as far as known) were:

- Johann Ostendorf (around 1855)
- Rudolf Ostendorf (1890–1922(?))
- Franz Diekmann (1922–1938)
- Anton Geltjen (1938–1945, appointed by the NSDAP)

Honorary (voluntary) mayors since 1945 were:

- Julius Mäckel (1945–1946)
- Ludwig Middendorf (1946–1948)
- Georg Meyer (1948–1952)
- Josef Haverkamp (1952–1956)
- Josef Hachmöller (1956–1964)
- Heinrich Hoymann (1964–1968)
- Heinrich Kollbeck (1968)
- Gerhard Peuker (1968–1981)
- Josef Kathe (1981–2001)

Former municipal directors:

- Gustav Thies (1948–1949)
- Ludwig Kistner (1949–1951)
- Aloys Meyer (1951–1977)
- Helmut Brüning (1977–1989)
- Heinrich Rammler (1990–2001)

Former full-time mayors:

- Heinrich Moormann (2001–2014)
- Frank Bittner (2014–2021)

==== Current mayor ====
The current full-time mayor of the town of Dinklage is Carl Heinz Putthoff (independent). In the election held in September 2021, in which he was the sole candidate, he received 77.78% of the vote and took office on 1 November 2021. Prior to this, Putthoff served as the city’s treasurer and as the general deputy of the then mayor Frank Bittner, who did not run for re-election in 2021.

Since 2001, the duties of the municipal director have been assumed by the respective full-time mayor.

=== Members of Parliament from Dinklage ===
Since the German Revolution of 1848–1849, the following politicians born in Dinklage have served as members of the Frankfurt National Assembly or different parliaments:

- Franz Heinrich Tappehorn: Member of the Frankfurt National Assembly (1848/1849)
- Ferdinand Heribert Graf von Galen: Member of the Oldenburg State Parliament (1872–1875) and of the Reichstag (1874–1903)
- Josef Schulte: Member of the Oldenburg State Parliament (1896–1908)
- Heinrich Fröhle: Member of the Oldenburg State Parliament (1919–1928 and 1930–1932)
- Franz von Galen, younger brother of the later Cardinal von Galen: Member of the Prussian State Parliament in 1932 and 1933
- Friedrich Mathias von Galen, born in Münster: Member of the Reichstag from 1907 to 1918
- August Wegmann: Member of the Reichstag from 1924 to 1933 (Centre Party). After 1945, CDU politician; initially Minister of the Interior and Deputy Minister President of the State of Oldenburg. From 1946, Lower Saxony’s Minister of the Interior and Deputy Minister President, later Minister of Finance and administrative president of the Oldenburg administrative district.

=== Town twinning ===
Since 1986, Dinklage has maintained a partnership with the French municipality of Épouville in Normandy.

== Industry and economy ==
=== Industrial development ===
The large increase in population, with the resulting expansion of available manpower, brought about mechanization among the craftsmen of Dinklage; the first were the weavers. The brothers van der Wal from the Netherlands wanted to use the existing specialists to place an industrial weaving and printing work near the brook Mühlenbach. In 1837, a corresponding proposition went out to the Amt (government office). Despite some protest from the jurisdiction of Vechta, a dyer named Mertz from Vechta and a calico manufacturer named Bremswig from Bakum were authorized to found businesses.

A second pioneer of the industrialization of Dinklage, in the second half of the century, was the miller and cartwright Bernard Holthaus. He profited from the increasing modernization of agriculture. His machines and appliances found wide sales nationwide and finally led to the foundation of a factory for agricultural machines. It was one of the largest businesses in the entire dukedom in the nineteenth century.

=== Current industry ===
To this day, Dinklage's economy remains strongly shaped by agriculture and by the production and processing of food products. These sectors are closely linked with animal feed manufacturers and suppliers of livestock housing and agricultural technology. The local economy is further complemented by industrial, craft, and commercial enterprises as well as a range of service providers.

Among the companies of supra-regional importance headquartered in Dinklage are, among others:

- Bröring Group (animal feed production and agricultural trade)
- Oldenburger Interior GmbH & Co. KG (interior outfitting of yachts, ships, and aircraft)
- Hilgefort GmbH (steel processing)
- Heller Tools GmbH
- Alwid GmbH (manufacture of filling and sealing machines for the food, chemical, and pharmaceutical industries)
- Erich Stallkamp ESTA GmbH
- Gigant – Trenkamp + Gehle GmbH
- Kaubit Chemie AG

=== Energy generation ===
- Bünne Wind Farm
- Höne Wind Farm
- Langwege Wind Farm
- Wulfenau Wind Farm

=== Agriculture and forestry ===
In the past, the von Galen family owned extensive agricultural and forest lands in Dinklage and had a significant role as landlords for local farmers. Over time, various parcels of land were sold. In connection with the insolvency of the SMH Bank and the involvement of the von Galen family, the family lost its last agriculturally used lands in Dinklage during the 1980s.

Today, agriculturally used land in the town of Dinklage covers 5,181 hectares (71.2% of the municipal area), while forestry land accounts for 783 hectares (10.8% of the municipal area). Agricultural production in Dinklage focuses primarily on crops for animal feed and food production, including barley, rye, wheat, oats, and maize, as well as potatoes, vegetables, and sugar beets. Fruit cultivation is also practiced, for example apples, cherries, and strawberries.

In addition, intensive livestock farming is prevalent in Dinklage and the surrounding area, particularly pig production, as well as cattle and broiler farming, egg production, and dairy farming.

== Transport ==
=== Roads ===
Dinklage is located west of the Federal Motorway A 1 (the Hansalinie), roughly halfway between Bremen and Osnabrück, and is accessible via Exit 65 (Lohne/Dinklage).

Federal Highway B 214 runs through the district of Langwege in the southern part of the municipal area.

The network of state and district roads in Dinklage totals approximately 35 km, while municipal roads account for about 133 km.

=== Public transportation ===
The nearest operational railway stations or stops are located in Lohne, Holdorf, and Quakenbrück. Long-distance rail stations are available in Diepholz, Osnabrück, and Bremen.

The Dinklage–Brockdorf–Lohne bus route operates on weekdays.

In 2013, the district-wide on-demand bus service moobil+ was launched. More than 70 bus stops were established within the Dinklage municipal area. On weekdays, moobil+ services connect Dinklage and its districts with the municipality of Holdorf, the town of Lohne, and the town of Quakenbrück. An additional moobil+ route to the district capital, Vechta, commenced operation in 2016.

=== Airports ===
The nearest intercontinantal airport is the Amsterdam Airport, located app. 150 miles to the west.

The nearest international commercial airports are Bremen Airport (approximately 45 miles to the north) and Münster/Osnabrück Airport (approximately 50 miles to the south).

The closest regional airfield is located in Damme.

== Education ==
=== Kindergartens and childcare ===
- Six kindergartens/childcare centers (including one center with integration groups for children with physical disabilities). An additional childcare center is currently under construction.
- After-school care facilities
- Special-needs educational groups
- Child day care services

=== Schools ===
- Primary schools: Kardinal-von-Galen Schule and Grundschule Höner Mark
- Oberschule Dinklage: a partially comprehensive all-day secondary school combining all three lower secondary education tracks; includes an academic (grammar school) track up to Grade 10
- Kardinal-von-Galen-Haus: special education school with a focus on physical and motor development, including a boarding facility (operated by the Josefs-Gesellschaft)
- General education grammar schools (Gymnasien), vocational grammar schools, and private grammar schools are located in neighboring towns: Lohne (Gymnasium Lohne; Lohne Wirtschaftsgymnasium; Lohne Technical Grammar School); Quakenbrück: Artland-Gymnasium Quakenbrück, Vechta: Gymnasium Antonianum Vechta; Liebfrauenschule (private girls’ grammar school under church sponsorship); Kolleg St. Thomas (private grammar school under church sponsorship)
- Nearby vocational schools and colleges are located in Vechta, Bersenbrück, Lohne, and Diepholz.
- Music School Romberg
- Adult Education Center (Volkshochschule), Clemens August Werk

=== Universities ===
The next general universities in a 60 miles circle (100 km) are located in Vechta, Osnabrück, Oldenburg, Bremen and Münster

== Healthcare ==
- General physicians and specialist medical physicians
- Pharmacies
- Center of Excellence for Spine and Joint Care
- Facilities for physiotherapy, occupational therapy, speech and language therapy, as well as fitness centers
- Hospice (St. Anna)
- Social care services (nursing care services)

The nearest hospitals are located in Lohne (Oldb.), as well as in Vechta, Quakenbrück, and Damme.

== Sport ==
Several sports fields and sports halls, a squash hall, several tennis courts, an indoor swimming pool, an outdoor swimming pool, several riding arenas and riding grounds, a shooting range for sports shooters, and facilities for archery.

=== Sports clubs ===
- Turnverein Dinklage (TVD)
- Tennis Club Dinklage (TCD)
- Pony Club Dinklage – to become part of the Dinklage Equestrian Sports Club
- Riding and Driving Club Dinklage (RuFC, “Reiterverein”) – to become part of the Dinklage Equestrian Sports Club
- Hiking Group Dinklage
- Dinklage Sports Shooters
- Dinklage Archers

== General facilities ==
- City administration (town hall, etc.)
- Police station
- Volunteer fire brigade
- Community center
- Youth center
- Library (St Catharina)
- Outdoor swimming pool and indoor swimming pool
- Several sports halls and sports fields

== Architecture and sights ==
- Dinklage Castle (Dietrichsburg) is the largest moated castle in the Oldenburg Münsterland region. It was built in the 15th century. In 1941, Count Christoph Bernhard made Dinklage Castle available to the Benedictine nuns of Vinnenberg Abbey in Warendorf as a place of refuge; in 1945 they returned to Warendorf. Since 1946, a group of Benedictine nuns from the Priory of St. Gertrud in Alexanderdorf has lived at the castle, which became their property in 1949.
- The castle chapel (Burgkapelle) was built in 1844 and is located not far from Dinklage Castle (German: Dietrichsburg). Many members of the von Galen family are buried in the chapel. Until 1840, the Hugoburg stood on this site.
- The former Rentei (manorial treasury/administrative building) is located near Dinklage Castle (Dietrichsburg). Until 1677, the Herbordsburg stood here.
- Schwege Mill (Schweger Mühle) – also known as Bäukens Möhln or a Dutch-style gallery windmill – was built between 1848 and 1849 by the farmers Franz Heinrich Große Böckmann and Clemens August Schulte on Schulte’s property in Schwege. Since 2008, Schwege Mill has been part of the Lower Saxony Mill Route. The local heritage association Herrlichkeit Dinklage operates an exhibition barn next to the mill, featuring the permanent exhibition From Grain to Bread, changing special exhibitions, and a grain trail.
- The Evangelical Church of Wulfenau, surrounded by tall trees, is a single-nave church with a gabled roof and brick cladding in a simple decorative style. It is an early Historicist chapel church, consecrated in 1852. The west tower with its tall pointed spire was added in 1894.
- The Catholic Church of St. Catharina was built in 1878. At 233 ft, its tower is the tallest church structure in the Oldenburg Münsterland. In 1878, Clemens August Count von Galen—later Bishop of Münster and Cardinal—was baptized here.
- The present-day town hall of Dinklage was built in 1903 as Villa Dr. Meyer.
- The old railway station was built in 1907. After completion of the Lohne–Dinklage railway line, the representative station building was erected. Today, following the closure of rail operations, it serves as a local history museum.
- Villa Holthaus is a factory owner's villa built in 1918. This Gründerzeit villa was used as an administrative building by the companies Holthaus and Wehrhahn until the 1970s and is now privately occupied.

=== Sightseeing routes ===
- Dinklage Monastery Castle (Abbey of St. Scholastica) is the final destination of the Cardinal's Way, a 15 miles pilgrimage route inaugurated on 28 October 2018 that leads from the former Benedictine monastery in Damme to Dinklage.
- The Path of Courage (Mut-Weg) connects the Catholic parish church of St. Catharina with Dinklage Castle. It was inaugurated on 22 March 2021, the 75th anniversary of the death of Cardinal Clemens August Count von Galen. Along a section of the historic Dinklage procession route, eight sculptures can be seen that are intended to commemorate the Cardinal’s courage.
- Several themed routes pass through Dinklage, including the 142 km-long holiday route known as the Artland Route, the Boxenstopp Route, and the Lower Saxony Mill Route (Niedersächsische Mühlenstrasse).
- In addition, there are approximately 110 km (68 mi) of cycling and hiking routes around Dinklage, for example the Cycling by Numbers routes (Fahren nach Zahlen).

=== Art in public spaces ===
As part of the reconstruction of the Dinklage Ring road, several roundabouts were created and equipped with artworks. At the southeastern starting point of the Dinklage Ring, the steel sculpture "Mutkugel" ('Sphere of Courage') commemorates Cardinal Clemens August Graf von Galen.

Another figure honored through roundabout art is the Dinklage musician Bernhard Romberg, depicted in the roundabout at Dinklage Ring – Märschendorfer Straße.

On the occasion of the 75th anniversary of the death of Clemens August Cardinal von Galen (22 March 2021), a miniature version of the "Mutkugel" was installed along the procession route between Dinklage Castle and the parish church of St. Catharina. Along the section of the path between the Nepomuk Bridge and Matthiasstraße, eight steles mark the so-called "Path of Courage" (Mut-Weg). They were created by Alfred Bullermann based on designs by students from Dinklage.

== Natural environment and recreational areas ==
There are 13 listed natural monuments in Dinklage.

The surrounding area of the town of Dinklage offers a wide range of landscapes of scenic and ecological value. These include:

- Bockhorster Moor (Landscape Conservation Area)
- Wulfenau Heide,
- Höner Heide,
- Bünner Wohld.

=== Burgwald Dinklage ===
The forest area borders directly to the east on the contiguous settlement area of Dinklage and comprises a deciduous woodland with a long continuity of forest cover near the former Dinklage Castle, from which the forest takes its name. The largest proportion of the area consists of old, acidic-soil oak forests dominated by pedunculate oak, within which mostly smaller deciduous woodland plantations are found.

Until 2017, the entire Burgwald forest and the adjacent agriculturally used areas were protected as a landscape conservation area. In October 2017, 126 hectares of this landscape conservation area were designated as a nature reserve (the Burgwald Dinklage Nature Reserve).

== Notable residents ==
Sons and daughters of Dinklage:

- Franz Wilhelm von Galen zu Assen (1648–1716), hereditary chamberlain of the Prince-Bishopric of Münster
- Franz Heinrich Christian von Galen zu Assen (1679–1712), canon
- Friedrich Christian von Galen zu Assen (1689–1748), dean of the cathedral chapter in Münster
- Wilhelm Ferdinand von Galen zu Assen (1690–1769), hereditary chamberlain and district administrator (Amtsdrost) of the Vechta district
- Bernhard Romberg (1767–1841), cellist and composer. In addition to his work as a cellist, Romberg composed operas, symphonies, and chamber music
- Franz Heinrich Tappehorn (1785–1856), member of the Frankfurt National Assembly
- Klemens von Korff (1804–1882), owner of a knightly estate, district administrator (1855–1875) of the Halle (Westphalia) district, and member of parliament
- Bernard Neteler (1821–1912), theologian and biblical scholar; author of numerous works on biblical studies
- Clemens August Count von Galen (1878–1946), Bishop of Münster from 1933 to 1946 and Cardinal from 1946; outspoken critic of the National Socialist dictatorship. Beatified in Rome on 9 October 2005; feast day: 22 March
- Heinrich Fröhle (1879–1966), farmer and politician (Zentrumspartei)
- Franz von Galen (1879–1961), member of the Prussian State Parliament (1932–1933); resigned his mandate in protest against the Enabling Act; imprisoned in Sachsenhausen concentration camp in 1944–1945
- August Wegmann (1888–1976), member of the Reichstag (Zentrumspartei, 1924–1933); dismissed from civil service by the Nazis and victim of Aktion Gitter. After 1945, CDU politician; initially Minister of Interior and Deputy Prime Minister of the former State of Oldenburg; from 1946 Minister of the Interior and Deputy Prime Minister of Lower Saxony, later Minister of Finance and administrative president of the Oldenburg administrative district
- Dieter Wurm (1935–2019), local politician (CDU) and Chairman of the Westphalia-Lippe Regional Association (LWL) (1999–2002)
- Hans Micheiloff (1936–1993), table tennis player; two-time German doubles champion
- Hubert Blömer (born 15 November 1939; died 10 March 2011 in Athens, Ohio), geographer and professor at Ohio University
- Jochen Arlt (born 1948), writer, now based in Cologne; editor-in-chief of the Rheinland Lesebuch
- Helmut Middendorf (born 1953), painter associated with “Neue Wilde”; lives and works in Berlin and Athens. His work is known for its vivid color dynamics and expressive, often figurative compositions. One of his best-known works is Big City Night (1979). His works are held, among others, by the Berlinische Galerie (Berlin) and the Museum of Modern Art (New York)
- Hannes Möller (born 1954), painter; lives and works near Frankfurt am Main. A well-known work is the graphic cycle Totenhaus, based on notes from a mortuary by Dostoevsky and the opera From the House of the Dead by Leoš Janáček
- Markus Tepe (1971–2021), visual artist and lecturer in painting and graphic arts; his work includes drawings and prints on paper, lithographs, and oil and acrylic paintings on canvas
- Petra Quade (nee Buddelmeyer), six-time Paralympic gold medalist in athletics (sprint and long jump) at the New York (1984) and Seoul (1988) Paralympic Games; born and raised in Dinklage

Persons who lived or worked in Dinklage:

- Ferdinand Heribert von Galen (1831–1906), member of the Oldenburg State Parliament (1872–1875); member of the German Reichstag (1874–1903)
- Friedrich Mathias von Galen (1865–1918), member of the Westphalian Provincial Parliament; member of the Reichstag (1907–1918)
- Máire Hickey, OSB (1938–2025), Irish classical philologist and Benedictine nun; Abbess of the Benedictine Abbey of St. Scholastica, Burg Dinklage (1983–2007)
- Ulrich Kirchhoff (born 1967), show jumper, double Olympic champion; grew up in Dinklage and began his sporting career there
- Henrike Franziska Voet (born 1983), Mayor of the town of Lohne; worked at the Federal Ministry of the Interior and Community from 2013 to 2020, most recently as Government Director; grew up in the Höne rural district of Dinklage
- Kristina Bröring-Sprehe (born 1986), dressage rider; Olympic champion, world champion, and German champion; grew up in Dinklage and lives there
- Madita Kohorst (born 14 October 1996), handball player in the German Bundesliga, VfL Oldenburg
- Vivien Endemann (born 7 August 2001), footballer in the Bundesliga (VfL Wolfsburg) and the German national team; Olympic participant; grew up in Dinklage and began her sporting career at TV Dinklage
- Julia Middendorf (born 31 January 2003), tennis player with an international world ranking; grew up in Dinklage and lives there
