= PHW Group =

German company in the meat industry

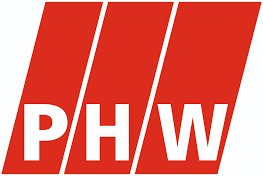
- Industry: Meat industry
- Predecessor: Lohmann & Co. AG
- Founded: 1998; 28 years ago
- Founder: Paul-Heinz Wesjohann
- Headquarters: Visbek-Rechterfeld, Germany
- Area served: Worldwide
- Key people: Peter Wesjohann (CEO)
- Revenue: €2.768 billion (2021)
- Owner: Paul-Heinz Wesjohann and Family
- Number of employees: 8900
- Website: phw-gruppe.de/en/

The PHW Group is a German family business in the meat industry that operates internationally. Its core business is meat processing of poultry. It is the largest company of the poultry industry in Germany and the fourth-largest in Europe. The PHW Group is headquartered in Visbek-Rechterfeld in the Oldenburg Münsterland region, Germany.

== Structure ==
The PHW Group is made up of two parent companies: the Erste Paul-Heinz Wesjohann GmbH & Co. Kommanditgesellschaft with €2,232.5 million in sales, and the Zweite Paul-Heinz Wesjohann GmbH & Co. Kommanditgesellschaft with €585.8 million in sales in the 2020/2021 financial year, both based in Rechterfeld. Part of the PHW group are several subgroups, among them the Lohmann & Co. AG based in Vaduz, Liechtenstein, which the PHW Group uses for public appearances.

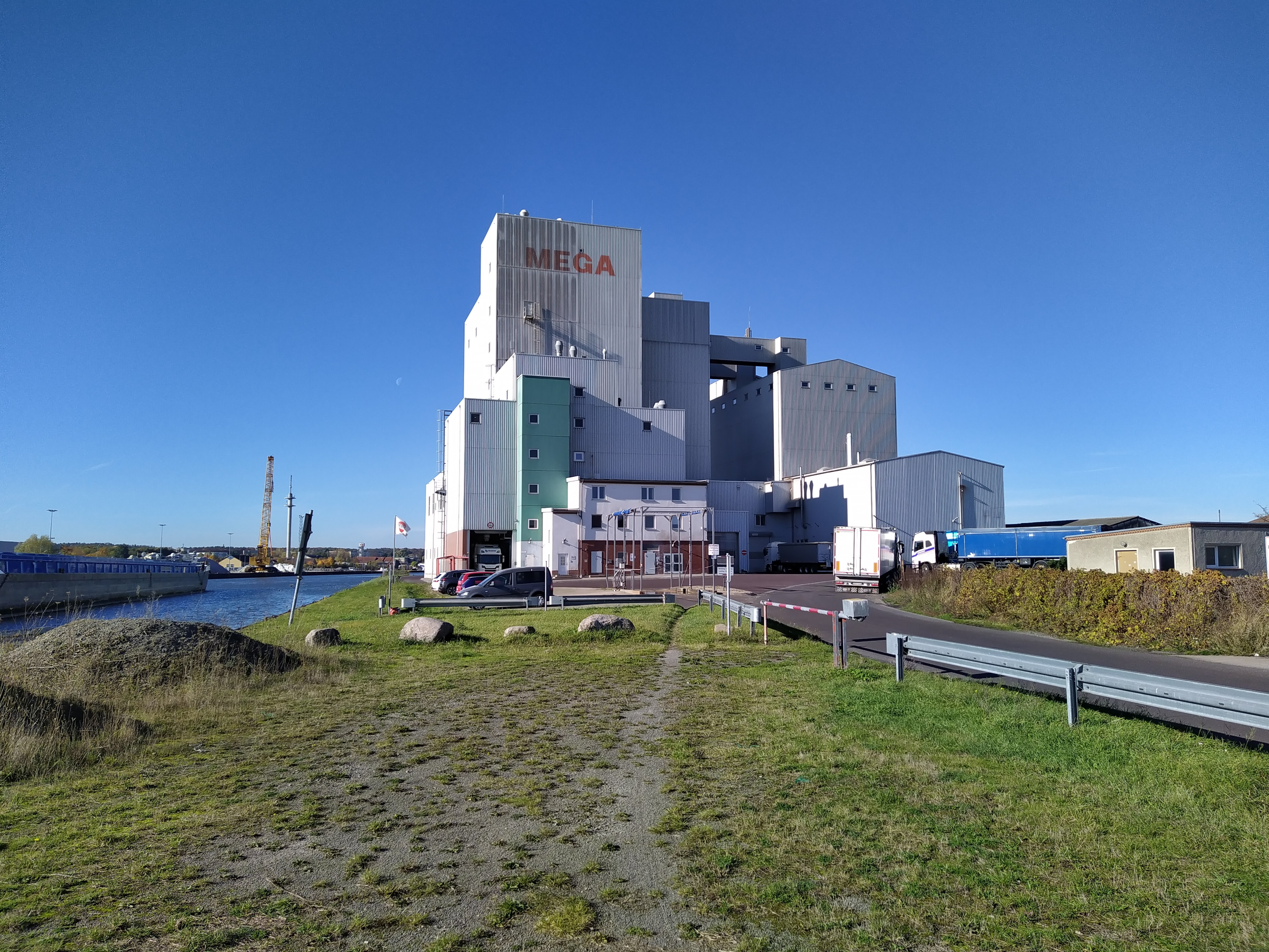
Site of the subsidiary company MEGA Tierernährung.

The core business area of the PHW Group is poultry production under the brand Wiesenhof. The PHW Group features a strong vertical integration and combines large parts of the poultry production chain. These include hatcheries, fattening, the production of feed and veterinary medicine, logistics, the slaughtering and cutting of poultry, and the processing and marketing of poultry meat. Chickens are the main products processed, along with turkeys and ducks. The PHW Group also owns just under 50 percent of the shares of the WIMEX Group, one of the world's largest suppliers of day old chicks of the Cobb breed.

Additionally, the company has a business sector alternative proteins, which in the fiscal year 2020/2021 made up €16.8 million (0,6% of the total revenue).

== Controversies ==
=== Exploitation of workers ===
The PHW Group was repeatedly criticized for bad working conditions. Im 2007, the ZDF broadcast the TV format Frontal21 documenting very bad working conditions and wages of Polish migrant workers. In 2011, similar conditions were documented by a ARD TV-reportage.

=== Animal abuse ===
Mistreatment of animals in the farms and the slaughterhouses was repeatedly criticized sharply. In 2010, the ARD broadcast a Report Mainz reportage uncovering serious animal welfare violations at a chicken breeding farm. In another ARD reportage in 2011 and in a Stern TV reportage in 2013, further cases of animal abuse were documented.

=== Environmental issues ===
The PHW Group is accused of overexploitation of groundwater resources in the vicinity of its production sites. In Lohne, groundwater levels near a plant of the PHW Group were documented to have dropped by several meters since 1951.

=== Illegal price agreements and tax evasion ===
In 2014, the German Federal Cartel Office imposed fines totaling approximately €338.5 million on 21 sausage producers and 33 responsible individuals. The so-called Wurstkartell (German for sausage cartel) also involved PHW Group subsidiary Wiesenhof Geflügelwurst GmbH & Co. KG based in Rietberg.

In 2019, the PHW Group relocated the registered office of Lohmann & Co. AG to Vaduz in Liechtenstein. The financial services provider Ganten Trustees Ltd. serves as the representative office, which previously appeared in the Panama Papers. The party Alliance 90/The Greens accused the PHW Group of tax evasion.

=== Protests ===
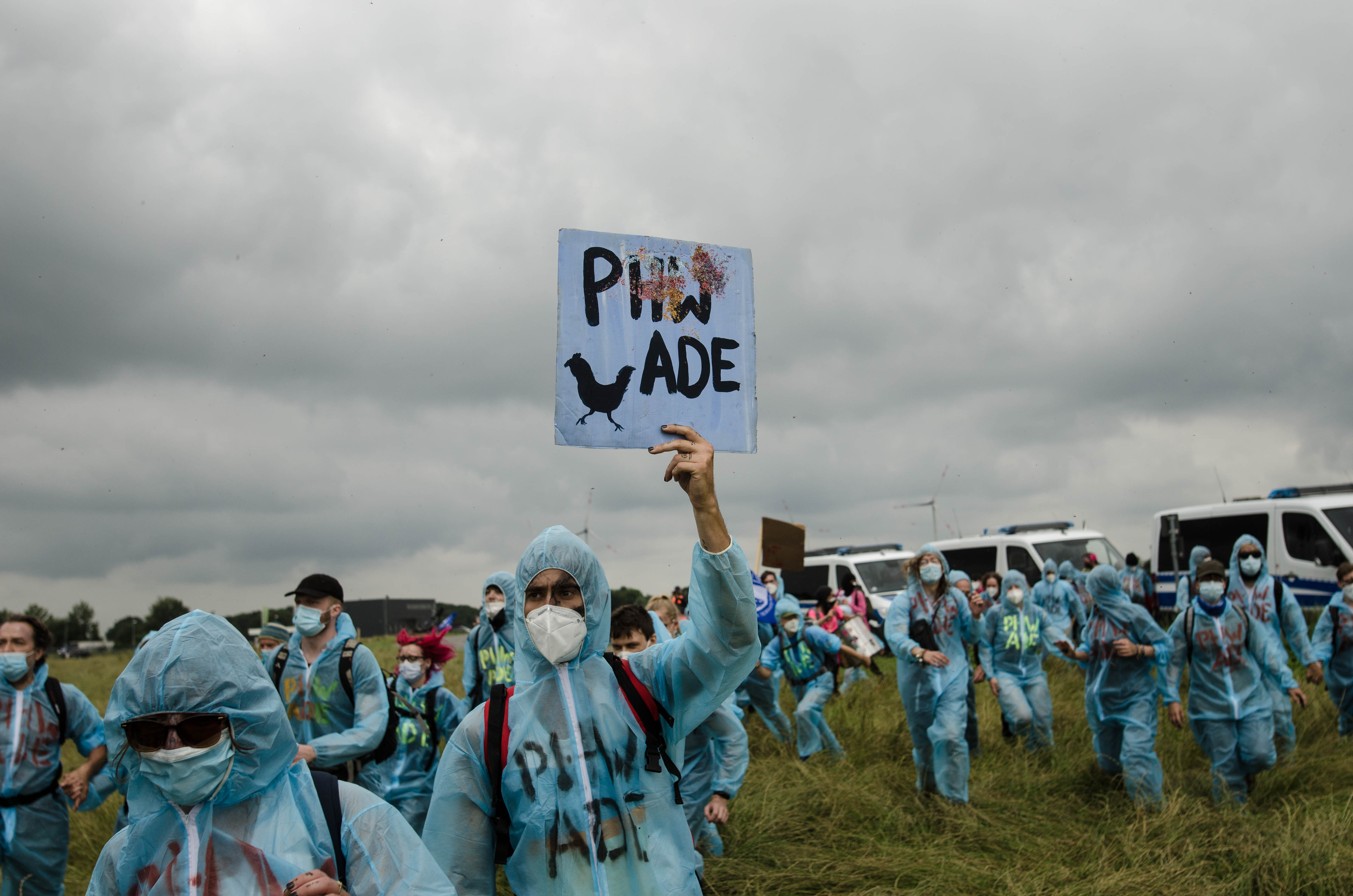
Protest at the headquarters of the PHW Group in Rechterfeld in 2021.

Environmental and animal rights activists blocked sites of the PHW Group multiple times in protest. In 2013, activists cemented themselves on the access road to the slaughterhouse in Bogen, Bavaria. In 2017, animal rights activists and members of citizens' initiatives blocked the slaughterhouse in Königs Wusterhausen, Brandenburg. In 2021, the alliance Gemeinsam gegen die Tierindustrie blocked the company headquarters in Rechterfeld with more than hundred activists.
