= Bakum =

- Municipality
- Coat of arms

- Location of Bakum within Vechta district
- Interactive map of Bakum
- Location within Germany Location within Lower Saxony
- Coordinates: 52°44′34″N 08°11′45″E
- Country: Germany
- State: Lower Saxony
- District: Vechta
- Subdivisions: 12 districts

Government
  - Mayor (2021–26): Tobias Averbeck (CDU)

Area
  - Total: 79 km^{2} (31 sq mi)
- Elevation: 31 m (102 ft)

Population (2025-12-31)
  - Total: 6,905
  - Density: 87/km^{2} (230/sq mi)
- Time zone: UTC+01:00 (CET)
  - Summer (DST): UTC+02:00 (CEST)
- Postal codes: 49456
- Dialling codes: 04446
- Vehicle registration: VEC
- Website: www.bakum.de

Bakum is a municipality in the district of Vechta, in Lower Saxony, Germany. It is situated in the Vechta district in western Lower Saxony. Bakum lies on the A1 freeway between Bremen and Osnabrück.
