= Lindern =

- Municipality
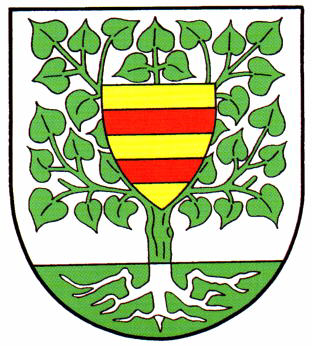
- Flag Coat of arms

- Location of Lindern within Cloppenburg district
- Interactive map of Lindern
- Location within Germany Location within Lower Saxony
- Coordinates: 52°50′42″N 7°46′41″E
- Country: Germany
- State: Lower Saxony
- District: Cloppenburg

Government
  - Mayor (2023–): Lydia Kocar (Ind.)

Area
  - Total: 65.8 km^{2} (25.4 sq mi)
- Elevation: 37 m (121 ft)

Population (2025-12-31)
  - Total: 4,949
  - Density: 75.2/km^{2} (195/sq mi)
- Time zone: UTC+01:00 (CET)
  - Summer (DST): UTC+02:00 (CEST)
- Postal codes: 49699
- Dialling codes: 05957
- Vehicle registration: CLP
- Website: www.lindern.de

Lindern (German pronunciation: [ˈlɪndɐn]; Low German: Linnern) is a municipality in the district of Cloppenburg, in Lower Saxony, Germany. It is situated approximately 20 km west of Cloppenburg.
