= Lastrup =

- Municipality
- Flag Coat of arms

- Location of Lastrup within Cloppenburg district
- Interactive map of Lastrup
- Location within Germany Location within Lower Saxony
- Coordinates: 52°46′N 7°50′E
- Country: Germany
- State: Lower Saxony
- District: Cloppenburg
- Subdivisions: 14 districts

Government
  - Mayor (2018–23): Michael Kramer (CDU)

Area
  - Total: 85.53 km^{2} (33.02 sq mi)
- Elevation: 45 m (148 ft)

Population (2025-12-31)
  - Total: 7,749
  - Density: 90.60/km^{2} (234.7/sq mi)
- Time zone: UTC+01:00 (CET)
  - Summer (DST): UTC+02:00 (CEST)
- Postal codes: 49688
- Dialling codes: 0 44 72; 0 44 77 (Lastrup-Hemmelte)
- Vehicle registration: CLP
- Website: www.lastrup.de

Lastrup (German pronunciation: [ˈlastʁʊp]; Low German: Laastrup) is a municipality in the district of Cloppenburg, in Lower Saxony, Germany. It is situated approximately 15 km southwest of Cloppenburg.

== Notable people ==
- Ludger Gerdes (1954–2008), painter and sculptor
- Andreas Schnieders (born 1966), boxer
- Özlem Türeci (born 1967), immunologist and businessperson
