= Oldenburg Münsterland =

Region and administrative area in Lower Saxony, Germany

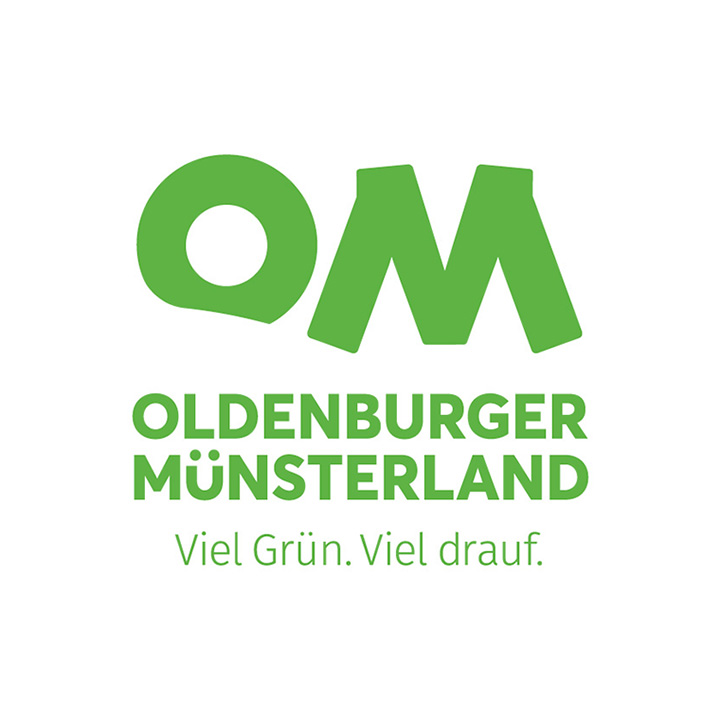
Logo of the Oldenburg Münsterland

The Oldenburg Münsterland, otherwise called Oldenburger Münsterland or Oldenburgisches Münsterland, is a region in Lower Saxony, Germany and the administrative area that comprises the federal districts of Cloppenburg and Vechta. It forms the southern part of the historical region of Oldenburg Land, so it is also called Südoldenburg. The inhabitants of the region accordingly call themselves Südoldenburger, with the denominative Oldenburger Münsterländer being rather uncommon.

== History ==
Locator map of Landkreis Cloppenburg in Lower Saxony, Germany

Locator map of Landkreis Vechta in Lower Saxony, Germany

In 1252, the Prince-Bishopric of Münster acquired the former County of Ravensberg-Vechta. With the conquest of the former Tecklenburg office of Cloppenburg in 1400, the common history of today's Oldenburg Münsterland in the Lower Chapter of Münster began. In 1668, the Bishop of Münster also gained ecclesiastical sovereignty over Lower Saxony. As a result of the Reichsdeputationshauptschluss of 25 February 1803, the Protestant Duke of Oldenburg gained state power over the offices of Cloppenburg and Vechta, whose population has remained predominantly Roman Catholic to this day.

During the so-called French period (1811–1813), the Oldenburg Münsterland was administered by the French-Hanseatic Département de l'Ems-Supérieur (Department of the Upper Ems). Until 1946, the Oldenburg Münsterland remained part of the Grand Duchy of Oldenburg or the Free State of Oldenburg (since 1919). Since 1946, the Oldenburg Münsterland has belonged to the German state of Lower Saxony and includes the area of the federal districts of Cloppenburg and Vechta.

== Economy ==
The Oldenburg Münsterland is shaped by a high density of intensive animal farming. Several large companies of the meat industry are headquartered in the region. The PHW Group, the largest German poultry meat producer, has its headquarters in Rechterfeld. The EW Group, the world market leader in poultry breeding and genetics, has its headquarters in Visbek. Further meat industry groups such as the Plukon Food Group and Westfleisch operate industrial meat processing facilities in the region.
