= Holdorf, Lower Saxony =

Holdorf
- Municipality
- Coat of arms

- Location of Holdorf within Vechta district
- Interactive map of Holdorf
- Location within Germany Location within Lower Saxony
- Coordinates: 52°35′18″N 8°7′43″E
- Country: Germany
- State: Lower Saxony
- District: Vechta
- Subdivisions: 10 districts

Government
  - Mayor (2019–24): Dr. Wolfgang Krug (CDU)

Area
  - Total: 54.86 km^{2} (21.18 sq mi)
- Elevation: 42 m (138 ft)

Population (2025-12-31)
  - Total: 7,546
  - Density: 137.6/km^{2} (356.3/sq mi)
- Time zone: UTC+01:00 (CET)
  - Summer (DST): UTC+02:00 (CEST)
- Postal codes: 49451
- Dialling codes: 05494
- Vehicle registration: VEC
- Website: www.holdorf.de

Holdorf is a municipality in the district of Vechta, in Lower Saxony, Germany. It is situated approximately 20 km southwest of Vechta, and 35 km north of Osnabrück. It is the native homeland of the Holdorf clan, who have since settled in Denmark.
