= Neuenkirchen-Vörden =

- Municipality
- Coat of arms

- Location of Neuenkirchen-Vörden within Vechta district
- Interactive map of Neuenkirchen-Vörden
- Location within Germany Location within Lower Saxony
- Coordinates: 52°31′N 08°04′E
- Country: Germany
- State: Lower Saxony
- District: Vechta
- Subdivisions: 10 districts

Government
  - Mayor (2021–26): Ansgar Brockmann (Ind.)

Area
  - Total: 90.85 km^{2} (35.08 sq mi)
- Elevation: 48 m (157 ft)

Population (2025-12-31)
  - Total: 8,857
  - Density: 97.49/km^{2} (252.5/sq mi)
- Time zone: UTC+01:00 (CET)
  - Summer (DST): UTC+02:00 (CEST)
- Postal codes: 49434
- Dialling codes: 0 54 93, 0 54 95
- Vehicle registration: VEC
- Website: www.neuenkirchen-voerden.de

Neuenkirchen-Vörden (until 1993 Neuenkirchen (Oldenburg)) is a municipality in the district of Vechta, in Lower Saxony, Germany. It is situated approximately 30 km southwest of Vechta, and 30 km north of Osnabrück.

== People ==
- Henry Richter (1838-1916), German born Roman-Catholic bishop
