= Vechta (district) =

District in Lower Saxony, Germany

Coordinates: 52°40′N 8°15′E

- District
- Flag Coat of arms
- Country: Germany
- State: Lower Saxony
- Capital: Vechta

Government
  - District admin.: Tobias Gerdesmeyer (CDU)

Area
  - Total: 813 km^{2} (314 sq mi)

Population (31 December 2024)
  - Total: 146,539
  - Density: 180/km^{2} (467/sq mi)
- Time zone: UTC+01:00 (CET)
  - Summer (DST): UTC+02:00 (CEST)
- Vehicle registration: VEC
- Website: kreis-vechta.de

Vechta (German pronunciation: [ˈfɛçta]) is a district (Landkreis) in Lower Saxony, Germany. It is bounded by (clockwise from the north) the districts of Oldenburg, Diepholz, Osnabrück and Cloppenburg.

== History ==
In the 13th century, the region was acquired by the bishop of Münster and became a part of his clerical state. When the clerical states of Germany were dissolved in 1803, Vechta was given to Oldenburg, while clerically still belonging to Münster, hence the name Oldenburger Münsterland is also used for the region (together with Cloppenburg district). The present district was established in 1945 and became a part of the newly founded state of Lower Saxony.

In terms of political history, both Vechta and neighbouring Cloppenburg are, as one of the few historically Catholic districts in an otherwise majority-Protestant state, some of the most conservative areas in Germany. The federal constituency Cloppenburg – Vechta is frequently the Christian Democratic Union's safest constituency, winning a majority in all but two elections since WWII.

== Geography ==
The countryside is generally flat. Only in the very south there is a hill chain close to the town of Damme, called the Damme Hills (Dammer Berge). The western shore of Lake Dümmer with its adjoining fens is also part of the district.

== Coat of arms ==
The coat of arms displays:

- the arms of Oldenburg
- the arms of the County of Calvelage-Ravensberg (which ruled over the region before the 13th century)
- the arms of the counts of Galen (who were vassals of the bishops of Münster)

== Cities and municipalities ==
Clickable map of towns and municipalities in the district

Cities
1. Damme
2. Dinklage
3. Lohne
4. Vechta
Free municipalities
1. Bakum
2. Goldenstedt
3. Holdorf
4. Neuenkirchen-Vörden
5. Steinfeld
6. Visbek
