= Garrel =

- Municipality
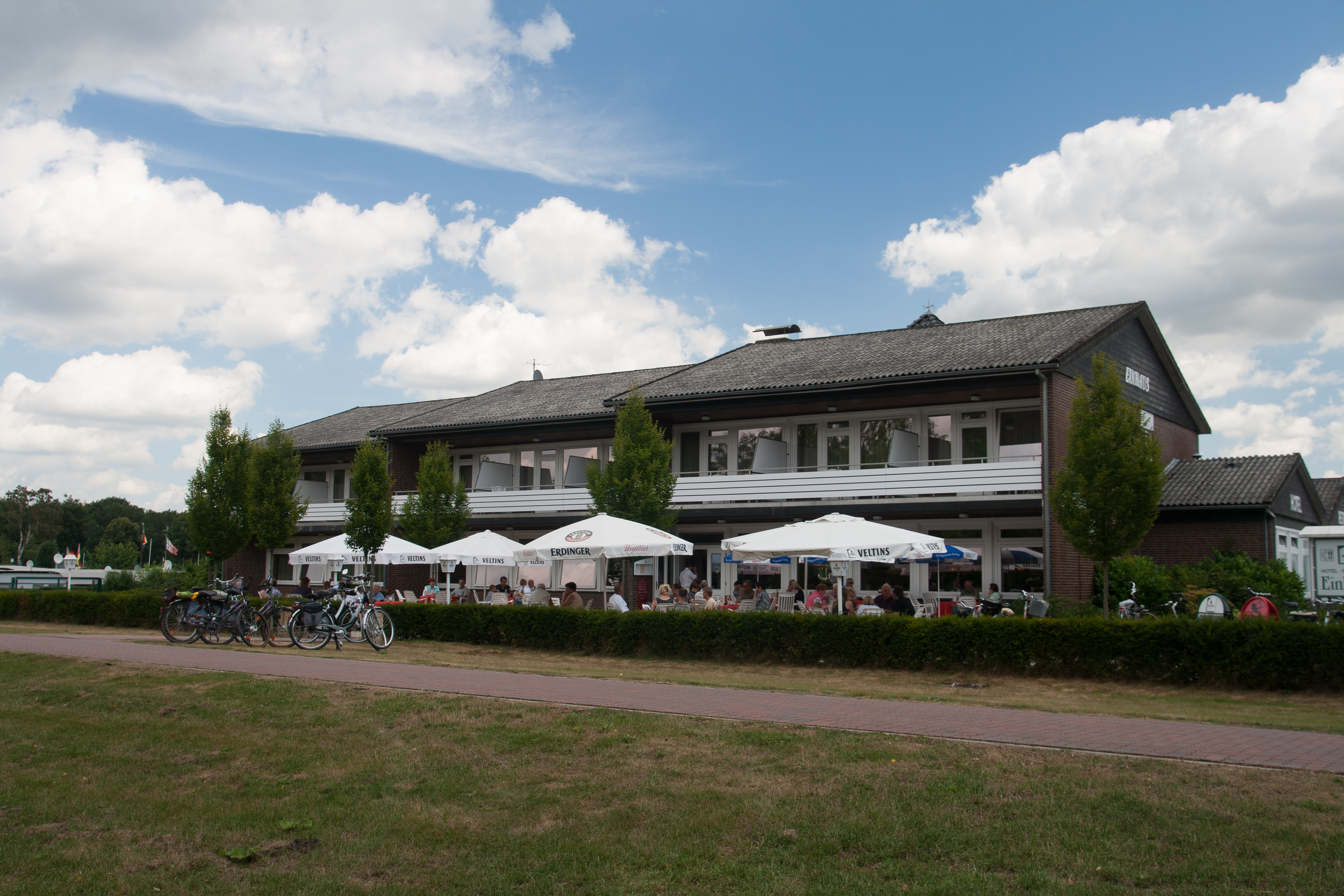

- Flag Coat of arms

- Location of Garrel within Cloppenburg district
- Interactive map of Garrel
- Location within Germany Location within Lower Saxony
- Coordinates: 52°57′29″N 8°1′31″E
- Country: Germany
- State: Lower Saxony
- District: Cloppenburg
- Subdivisions: 12 districts

Government
  - Mayor (2019–24): Thomas Höffmann

Area
  - Total: 113.23 km^{2} (43.72 sq mi)
- Elevation: 20 m (66 ft)

Population (2025-12-31)
  - Total: 15,407
  - Density: 136.07/km^{2} (352.41/sq mi)
- Time zone: UTC+01:00 (CET)
  - Summer (DST): UTC+02:00 (CEST)
- Postal codes: 49681
- Dialling codes: 04474, 04471
- Vehicle registration: CLP
- Website: www.garrel.de

Garrel (German pronunciation: [ˈɡaʁəl]) is a municipality in the district of Cloppenburg, in Lower Saxony, Germany. It is situated approximately 15 km north of Cloppenburg, and 25 km southwest of Oldenburg.

== People from Garrel ==
- Heinrich Timmerevers (born 1952), German Roman Catholic bishop
