= Bösel =

- Municipality
- Flag Coat of arms

- Location of Bösel within Cloppenburg district
- Interactive map of Bösel
- Location within Germany Location within Lower Saxony
- Coordinates: 53°0′21″N 7°57′15″E
- Country: Germany
- State: Lower Saxony
- District: Cloppenburg

Government
  - Mayor: Hermann Block

Area
  - Total: 100.1 km^{2} (38.6 sq mi)
- Elevation: 13 m (43 ft)

Population (2025-12-31)
  - Total: 8,987
  - Density: 89.78/km^{2} (232.5/sq mi)
- Time zone: UTC+01:00 (CET)
  - Summer (DST): UTC+02:00 (CEST)
- Postal codes: 26219
- Dialling codes: 0 44 94
- Vehicle registration: CLP
- Website: www.boesel.de

Bösel (German pronunciation: [ˈbøːzl̩]; Low German: Bäsel) is a municipality in the district of Cloppenburg, in Lower Saxony, Germany.

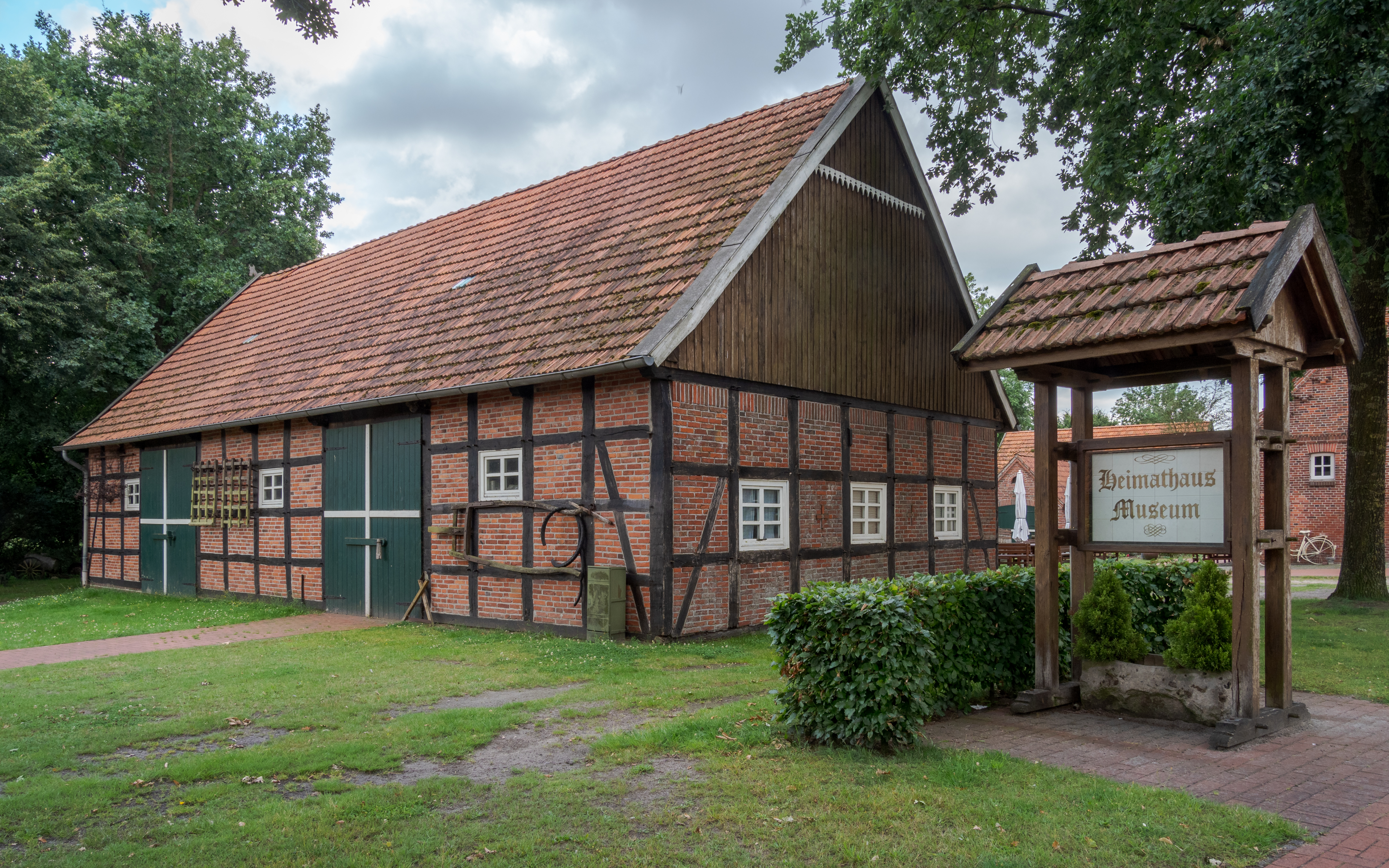
Timber framed barn of 'Heimathaus' Museum

== History ==
Bösel was first mentioned in 1080 under the name Borsla (= "Forest at a wavy bank") in a testimonial of the bishop of Osnabrück.

The first written document of a chapel in Bösel is dated with the year 1574, but Bösel was not separated from its mother church in Altenoythe and made an independent commune until 1876. Today Bösel consists of nine areas (Bösel-Ort, Edewechterdamm, Glaßdorf, Hülsberg, Osterloh, Ostland, Overlahe, Petersdorf und Westerloh).

== Politics ==
- Mayor: Hermann Block

The municipal council of Bösel consists of the following seats:

- CDU: 14 seats
- SPD: 2 seats
- FDP: 3 seats
- UWB: 2 seats

== Schools ==
- St.-Martin-Grundschule
- Haupt- und Realschule
- Grundschule Petersdorf

== Places of interest ==
- Museum park „Am Pallert“ which contains:
  - Heimathaus (traditional house)
  - Landmaschinenmuseum (Museum of agricultural engines)
  - Brotbackhaus (traditional bakery)
  - Bauerngarten in der Parkanlage (traditional rural garden within the park)

== Economy and Infrastructure ==
Bösel is member of the „Zweckverband Interkommunaler Industriepark Küstenkanal“ and takes places in the industrial area c-Port.

== Events ==
- Schuetzenfest
- Euro-Musiktage

== See also ==
- Greta Bösel (1908–1947), German concentration camp guard executed for war crimes
