= Barßel =

- Municipality
- Flag Coat of arms

- Location of Barßel within Cloppenburg district
- Interactive map of Barßel
- Location within Germany Location within Lower Saxony
- Coordinates: 53°10′13″N 07°44′48″E
- Country: Germany
- State: Lower Saxony
- District: Cloppenburg
- Subdivisions: 13 districts

Government
  - Mayor (2021–26): Nils Anhuth

Area
  - Total: 84.35 km^{2} (32.57 sq mi)
- Elevation: 2 m (6.6 ft)

Population (2025-12-31)
  - Total: 13,938
  - Density: 165.2/km^{2} (428.0/sq mi)
- Time zone: UTC+01:00 (CET)
  - Summer (DST): UTC+02:00 (CEST)
- Postal codes: 26676
- Dialling codes: 04499
- Vehicle registration: CLP
- Website: barssel.de

Barßel (German pronunciation: [ˈbaʁsl̩]; Low German: Bassel) is a municipality in the district of Cloppenburg, in Lower Saxony, Germany.

== Division of the municipality ==
Barßel consists of 13 districts:

- Barßel
- Barßelermoor
- Carolinenhof
- Elisabethfehn
- Harkebrügge
- Lohe
- Loher-Ostmark
- Loher-Westmark
- Neuland
- Neulohe
- Osterhausen
- Reekenfeld
- Roggenberg

== Sons and daughters ==
- Laurentius Siemer (1888-1956) German Dominican priest, and Provincial of the Dominican Province of Teutonia
- Christian Claaßen (born 1969), German footballer
