= Emstek =

- Municipality
- Flag Coat of arms

- Location of Emstek within Cloppenburg district
- Interactive map of Emstek
- Location within Germany Location within Lower Saxony
- Coordinates: 52°49′N 8°9′E
- Country: Germany
- State: Lower Saxony
- District: Cloppenburg
- Subdivisions: 8 districts

Government
  - Mayor (2021–26): Michael Fischer (CDU)

Area
  - Total: 108.39 km^{2} (41.85 sq mi)
- Elevation: 54 m (177 ft)

Population (2025-12-31)
  - Total: 12,558
  - Density: 115.86/km^{2} (300.07/sq mi)
- Time zone: UTC+01:00 (CET)
  - Summer (DST): UTC+02:00 (CEST)
- Postal codes: 49685
- Dialling codes: 0 44 73, 0 44 47
- Vehicle registration: CLP
- Website: www.emstek.de

Emstek (German pronunciation: [ˈɛmʃtɛk]; Low German: Emstäk) is a municipality in the district of Cloppenburg, in Lower Saxony, Germany. It is situated approximately 8 km east of Cloppenburg.

== Tourism ==
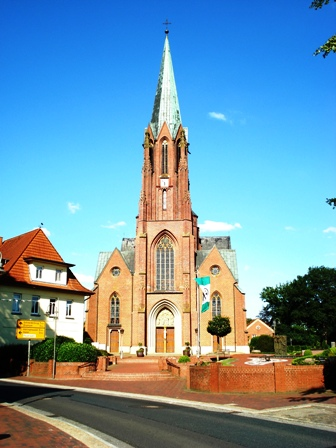
St. Margaretha Catholic Church, Emstek

Emstek is home to St. Margaretha's Catholic Church, designed by architect Johann Bernhard Hensen.

A 14th-century court location, known as Gogericht auf dem Desum, is located in the southern park of Emstek. The Gogericht was first mentioned in a document on January 25, 1322, when the court was acquired for the Münster Episcopal Office of Vechta. At that time, the court was responsible for the parishes of Lutten, Langförden, Cappeln, Krapendorf-Kloppenburg, Friesoythe and Molbergen, Visbek, Emstek, Wildeshausen, Huntlosen, Großenkneten, Oythe, Goldenstedt and Twistringen.

Emstek is also known for its Baumweg nature reserve, Bürgerpark, and a public swimming lake, Halener Badesee.
