= Cloppenburg (district) =

District in Lower Saxony, Germany

Coordinates: 52°50′N 8°00′E

- District
- Flag Coat of arms
- Country: Germany
- State: Lower Saxony
- Capital: Cloppenburg

Government
  - District admin.: Johann Wimberg (CDU)

Area
  - Total: 1,418 km^{2} (547 sq mi)

Population (31 December 2024)
  - Total: 177,025
  - Density: 124.8/km^{2} (323.3/sq mi)
- Time zone: UTC+01:00 (CET)
  - Summer (DST): UTC+02:00 (CEST)
- Vehicle registration: CLP
- Website: lkclp.de

Cloppenburg is a district in Lower Saxony, Germany. It is bounded by (from the north and clockwise) the districts of Ammerland, Oldenburg, Vechta, Osnabrück, Emsland and Leer.

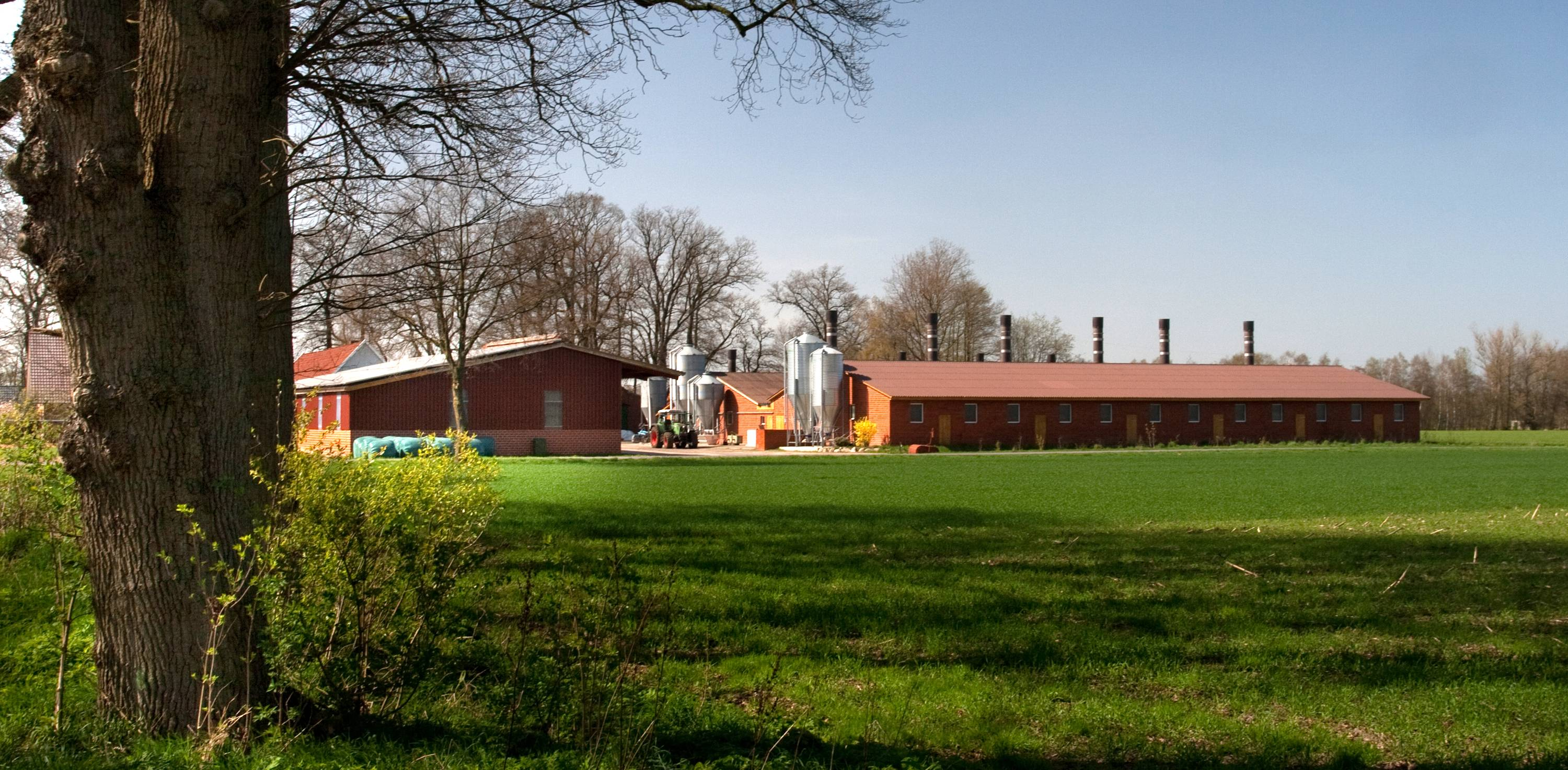
Factory farming near Hemmelte

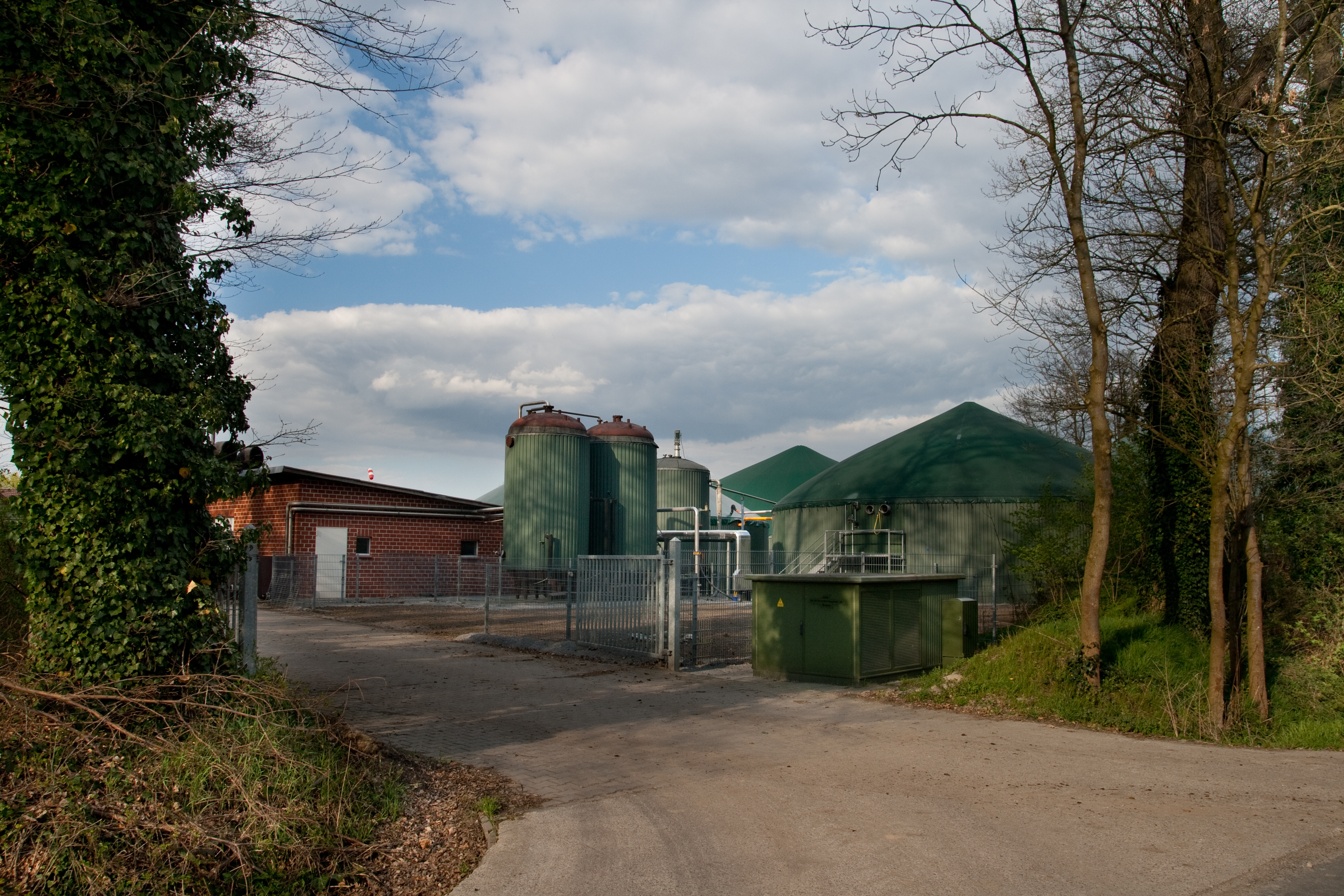
Biogas production near Sevelten

Like the neighbouring Vechta district, it is well known for factory farming, especially of turkeys and pigs. These two districts are also known as the Schweinegürtel (“pig belt”). The soil is mostly of poor quality. The mass import of animal feed made factory farming possible. With the help of liquid manure, corn is grown, which is also used for a growing production of biogas.

== History ==
The region was part of the County of Tecklenburg in medieval times. It was then for a long time (1400-1803) property of the Prince-Bishopric of Münster. In 1803 it was annexed by Oldenburg and remained a part of Oldenburg until 1945. The district was established in 1933.

In terms of political history, both Cloppenburg and neighbouring Vechta are, as one of the few historically Catholic districts in an otherwise majority-Protestant state, some of the most conservative areas in Germany. The federal constituency Cloppenburg – Vechta is frequently the Christian Democratic Union's safest constituency, winning a majority in all but two elections since WWII.

The district, alongside neighborging Vechta, have due to their large Catholic population the highest birth rates and lowest median ages in Germany.

== Geography ==
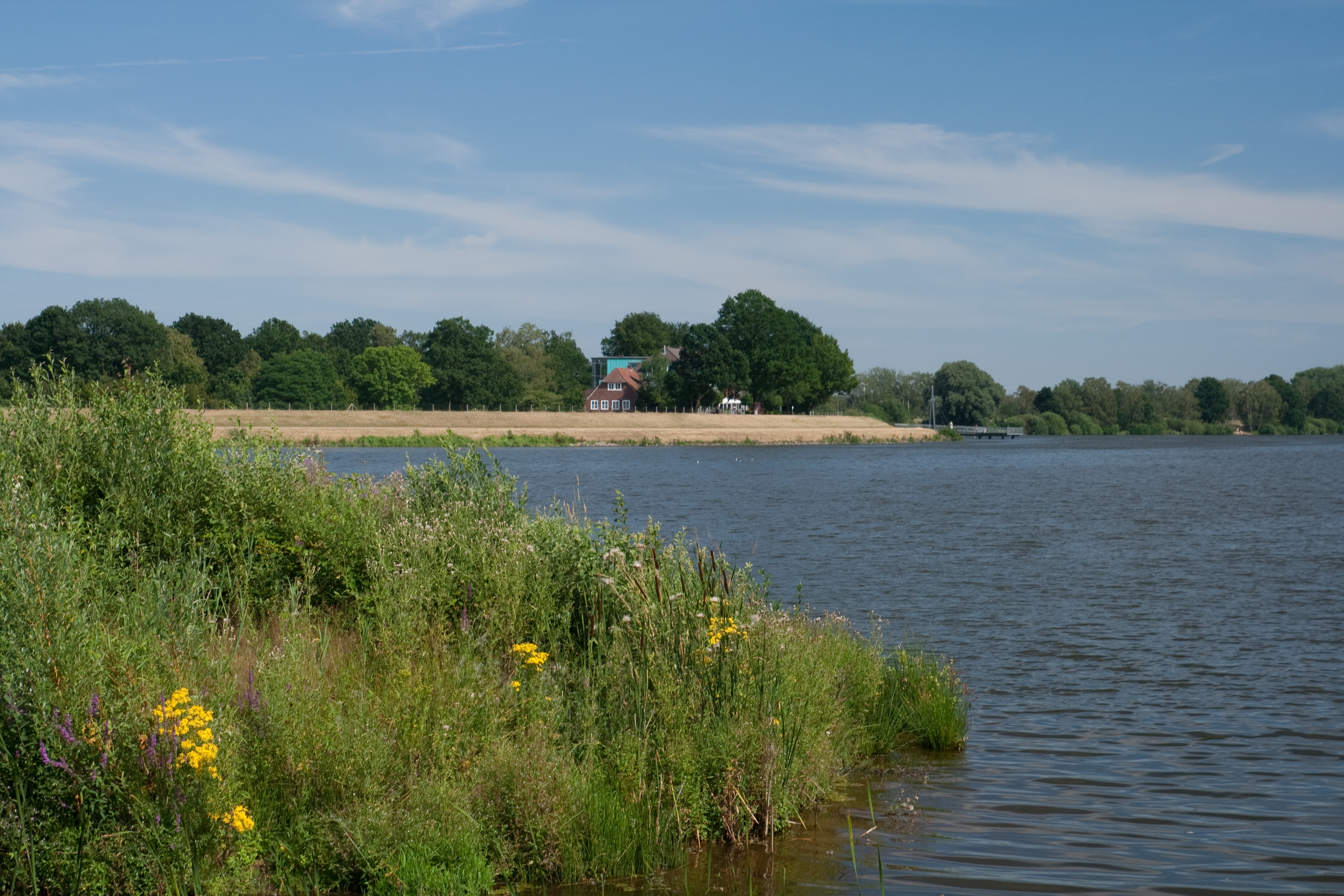
At the Thülsfelde Reservoir

The district comprises the western portion of a historical region called Oldenburgisches Münsterland, which means "lands of Oldenburg formerly held by Münster". It is a plain countryside, which was originally swampy and full of tiny rivers and brooks.

The Thülsfelde Reservoir is an artificial lake that was built between 1924 and 1927 in order to prevent floods in the area. Today it is a major tourist attraction with several camping sites and a youth hostel.

== Coat of arms ==
The coat of arms displays:

- top left and top right: the cross as well as the red stripes are part of the arms of Oldenburg
- bottom left: three water lilly leaves made up the arms of Tecklenburg
- bottom right: red and yellow are the colours of Münster

Its blazon is: "Quarterly; I: Or, two bars Gules; II: Azure, a cross Or; III: Argent, three water lily leaves Gules; IV: Or, a fess Gules".

== Towns and municipalities ==
Clickable map of municipalities in the district

Towns
Municipalities
1. Cloppenburg
2. Friesoythe
3. Löningen
1. Barßel
2. Bösel
3. Cappeln
4. Emstek
5. Essen
6. Garrel
7. Lastrup
8. Lindern
9. Molbergen
10. Saterland
