= Goldenstedt =

- Municipality
- Coat of arms

- Location of Goldenstedt within Vechta district
- Interactive map of Goldenstedt
- Location within Germany Location within Lower Saxony
- Coordinates: 52°47′N 8°25′E
- Country: Germany
- State: Lower Saxony
- District: Vechta

Government
  - Mayor (2019–24): Alfred Kuhlmann (CDU)

Area
  - Total: 88.5 km^{2} (34.2 sq mi)
- Elevation: 27 m (89 ft)

Population (2025-12-31)
  - Total: 10,342
  - Density: 117/km^{2} (303/sq mi)
- Time zone: UTC+01:00 (CET)
  - Summer (DST): UTC+02:00 (CEST)
- Postal codes: 49424
- Dialling codes: 04444
- Vehicle registration: VEC
- Website: www.goldenstedt.de

Goldenstedt is a municipality in the district of Vechta, in Lower Saxony, Germany. It is situated on the river Hunte, approximately 12 km northeast of Vechta.
