= Großes Moor (Vechta-Diepholz) =

Coordinates: 52°27′2″N 8°11′39″E

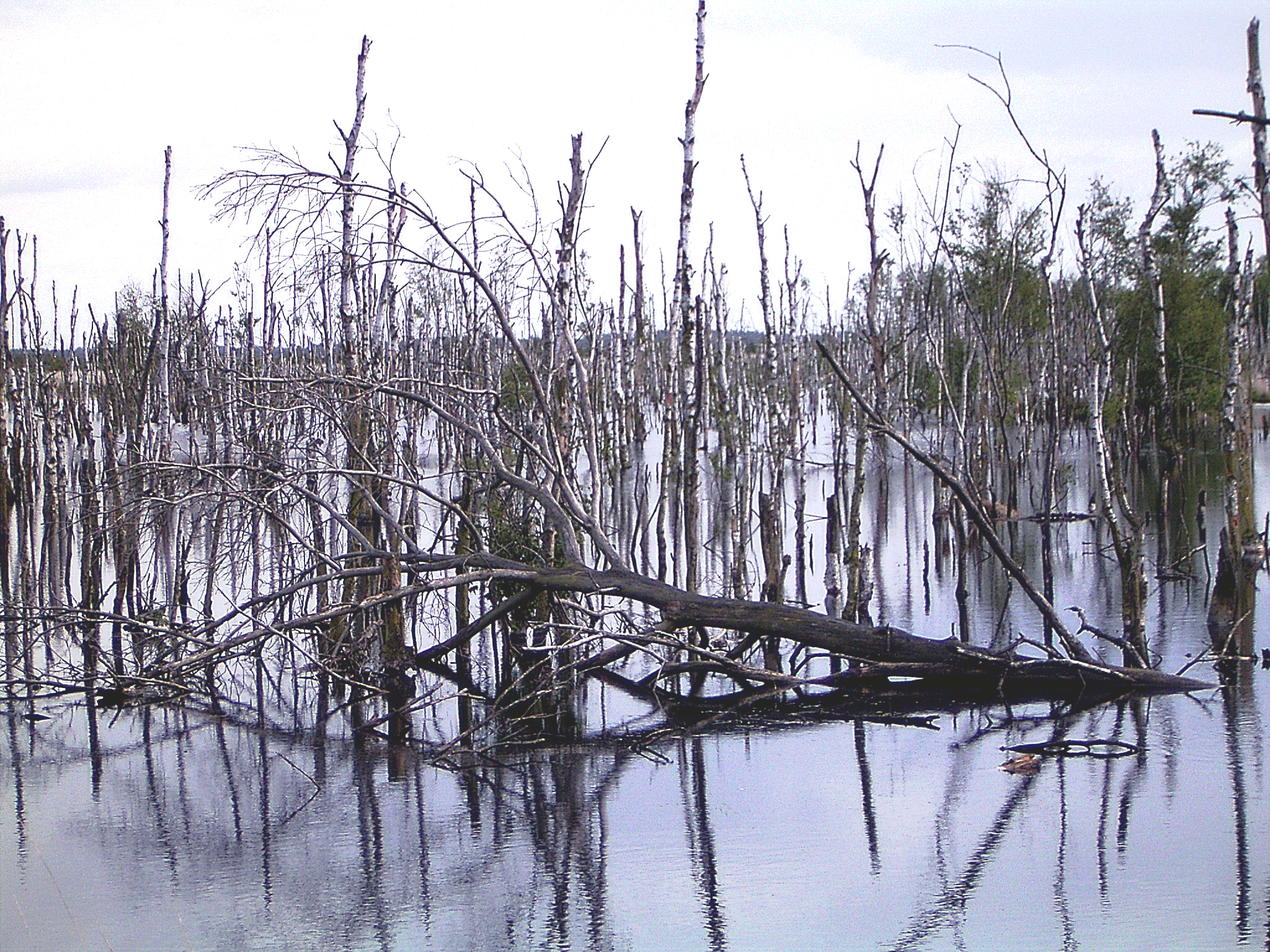
Reflooding in the Dreiecksmoor, a northern part of the Großes Moor

The Großes Moor ("Great Bog") is the proper name for a contiguous region of raised bog between the towns of Damme, Lohne and Vechta and the village of Goldenstedt in the county of Vechta on the one hand, and the villages of Diepholz and Barnstorf in Diepholz and Bramsche in Osnabrück in Lower Saxony on the other, all within Germany.

Confusingly, there are two smaller bogs in this region also called Großes Moor; sources that use these name generally refer to be overall region as the "Great Bogs" (Große Moore). One of the two smaller bogs named Großes Moor lies south of Damme; the other east of Vechta. Both are linked by a chain of intermediate bogs east of Steinfeld and Lohne.

The entire region consists of partly near-natural areas, former agricultural peat cuttings and raise bog grassland.

== Geography ==
=== Location ===
The Großes Moor lies in the southern part of the North German Plain along the boundary between the counties of Vechta and Diepholz. It is part of the natural region known as the "Ems-Hunte Geest and Dümmer Geest Lowland". To the north and west of the bog near Damme are the Damme Hills, whose spurs border the bog in the west in the region of the borough of Vechta.

The southern part of the Großes Moor extends into the Dümmer Nature Park, in which the lake of Dümmer is located. Not far south are the foothills of the Wiehen Hills, which are part of the North Teutoburg Forest-Wiehen Hills Nature Park. In front of this hill ridge and so near the Großes Moor a section of the Mittelland Canal runs from east to west by the boglands.

The northern part of the Großes Moor extends into the Wildeshausen Geest Nature Park.

to the east the bogland is adjoined by the Rehden Geest Moor; to the southeast rises the Kellenberg.

West of the Großes Moor runs the River Hase, east of that is the Hunte. Streams that flow into these rivers, drain the bog region.
