= Damme Hills =

Hill range in Germany

Damme Hills Dammer Berge
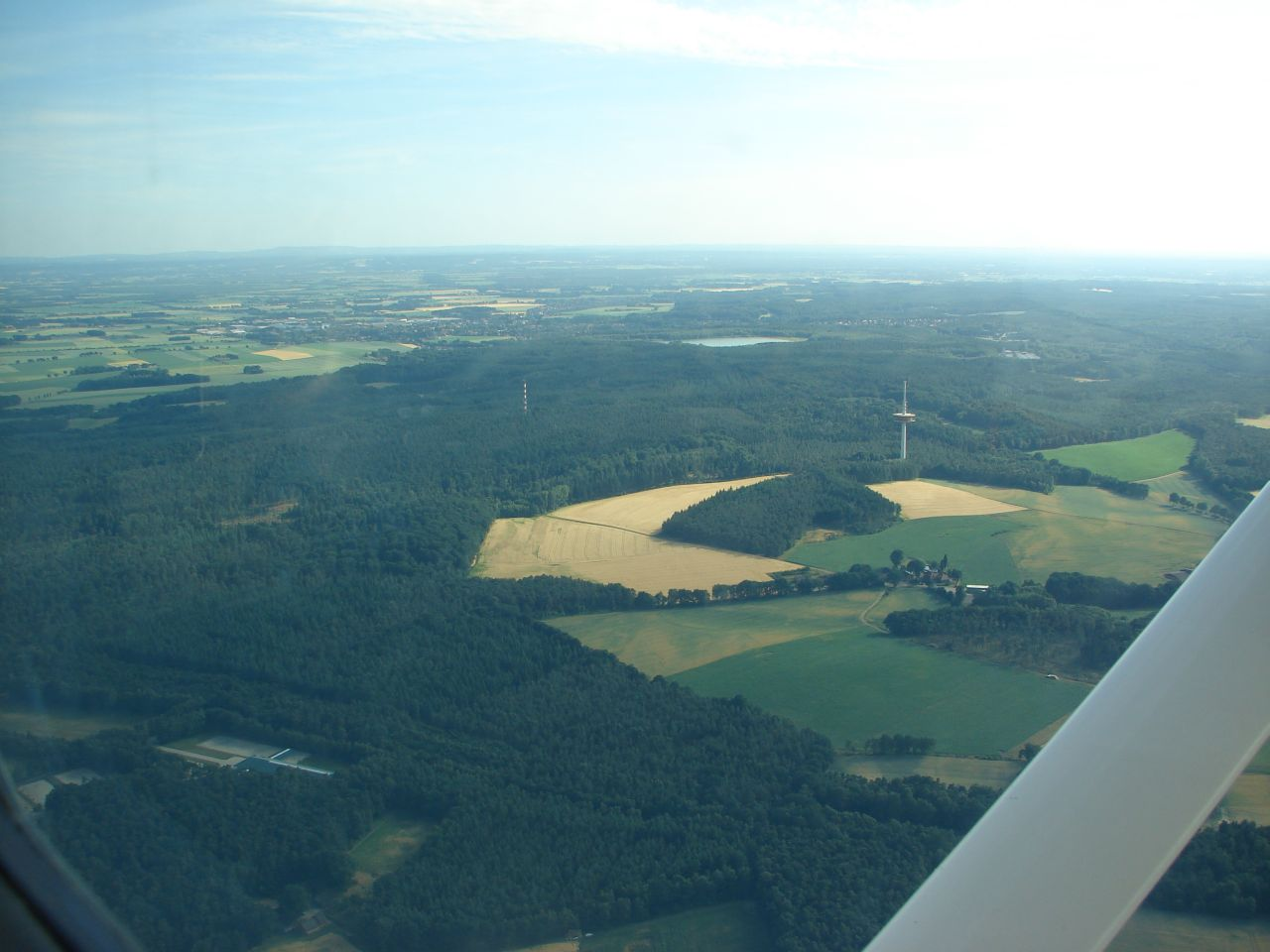
- The Damme Hills from the air: view from the direction of Steinfeld towards Damme, with the telecommunication tower, transmitter mast and "Damme Bergsee" (background)

Highest point
- Peak: Signalberg
- Elevation: 146 m above NHN

Geography
- Location within Lower Saxony
- State(s): near Damme; Vechta, Lower Saxony Germany
- Range coordinates: 52°33′10″N 8°12′57″E

Geology
- Rock type: End moraine of the Saale glaciation

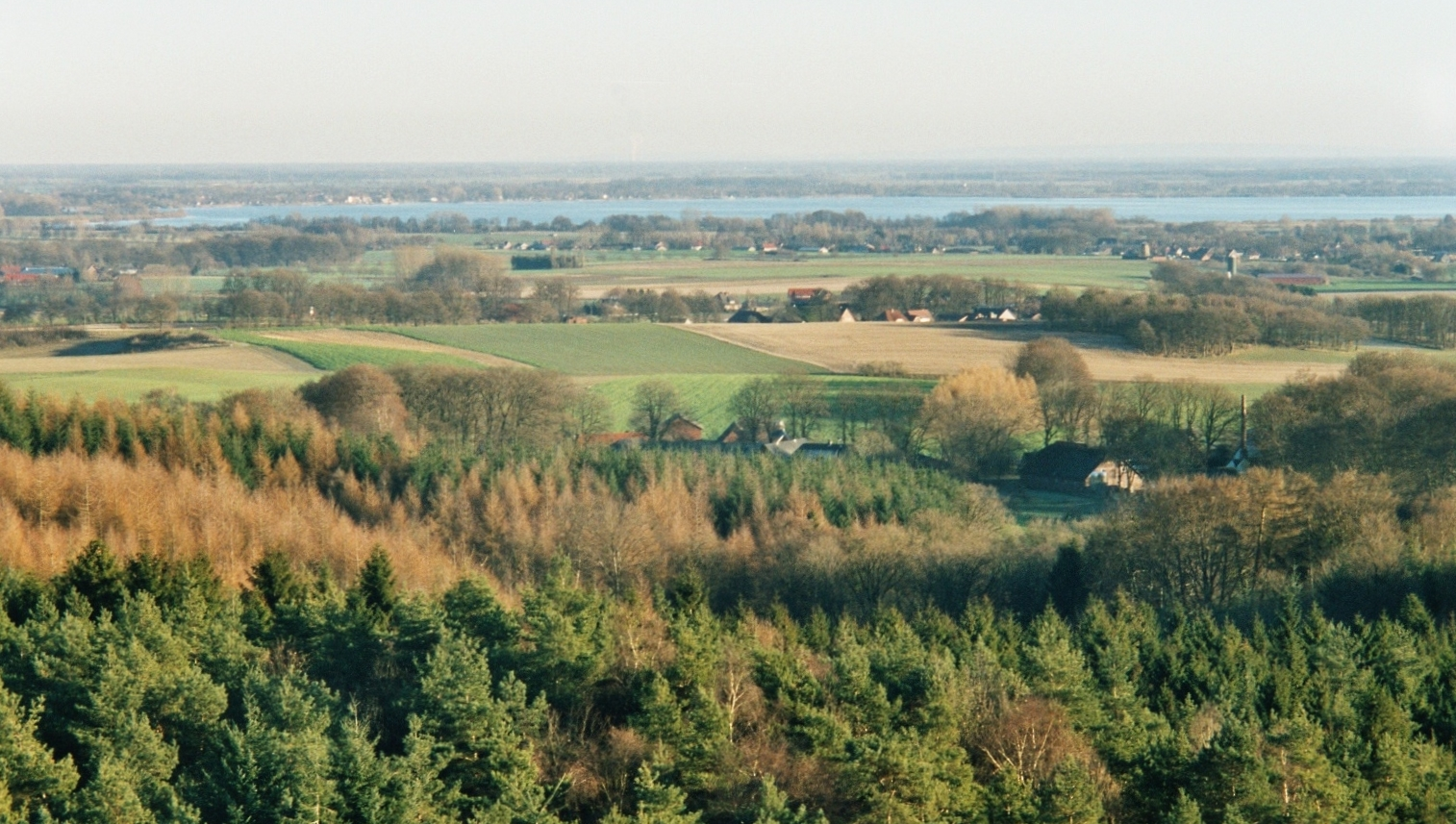
View from the observation tower on the Mordkuhlenberg to the Dümmer

The Damme Hills are a high, wooded ridge, up to 146 m above sea level (NN), in the Oldenburg Münsterland in the southern part of the district of Vechta, in western Lower Saxony, Germany.

== Geography ==
=== Location ===
The ridge of the Damme Hills, which is about 15 kilometres (9.3 mi) long and only a few kilometers wide, lies on the southern edge of the North German Plain about 34 kilometres (21 mi) north of the city of Osnabrück. It is located in the Dümmer Nature Park near the town of Damme, which lies in the centre of the region, and between Lohne (some distance to the north), Steinfeld (to the north), Diepholz (roughly east-northeast), Neuenkirchen-Vörden (to the southwest) and Holdorf (to the northwest). To the east the river Hunte flows from south to north past the ridge; to the west the river Hase runs in the same direction.

The Damme Hills lie in the southwestern part of the Oldenburg Münsterland, which is why the local Signal Hill (Signalberg, 146 m) is its highest elevation. To the northeast stretch the Großes Moor (near Vechta) and the hill of the Kellenberg; east of the ridge is the Dümmer, and behind it the Stemweder Berg, to the south – on the other side of the Großes Moor (near Damme) – are the Wiehen Hills in the North Teutoburg Forest-Wiehen Hills Nature Park and to the west on the other side of the Hase valley are the Ankum Heights.

=== Watersheds ===
The Damme Hills lie on the Weser-Ems watershed: All streams and rivers that run eastwards from the ridge, flow via the Hunte into the Weser, those that run westwards flow via the Hase into the Ems.

== Geology ==
The Damme Hills are part of a series of ice age end moraines from the part of the Saale glaciation, the so-called Drenthe I stage. The Lingen Heights, the Ankum Heights, the Kellenberg and the Brelinger Berg also belong to this push moraine, also called the Rehburg Phase, which can be dated to about 230,000 years ago. The Rehburg Hills by the lake of the Steinhuder Meer, are not, however, part of the moraine.

Together with their almost symmetrical counterpart, the Ankum Heights, the Damme Hills display the most marked glacial lobes of this push moraine. It filled the lowland bay of the Artland. Iron ore is found deep under the hills.

== Landscape scenery ==
In the gently curved ridge of the Damme Hills the wooded rolling hills and valleys alternate with meadows, fields and pastureland e. g. paddock). There are numerous paths for cyclists and hikers to enjoy the natural environment.

The lake known as the Damme Bergsee, roughly 25 ha in area, provides a refuge for rare animals and plants, which are described by means of a nature trail. Many endangered species of plant occur in this area: Of the hitherto 364 vascular plants, 68 species are on Lower Saxony's Red List of endangered types. One particularly notable group of animals are the reptiles, of which 4 species occur here: the grass snake, sand lizard, viviparous lizard and slowworm. From the bird world there are 5 species of woodpecker as well as woodcock, crossbill and pied flycatcher. In 1974 even rollers bred in this wooded area, but were later shot by a farmer. Three of Germany's largest native beetles live here: the stag beetle, rhinoceros beetle and cockchafer.

== Places of interest ==
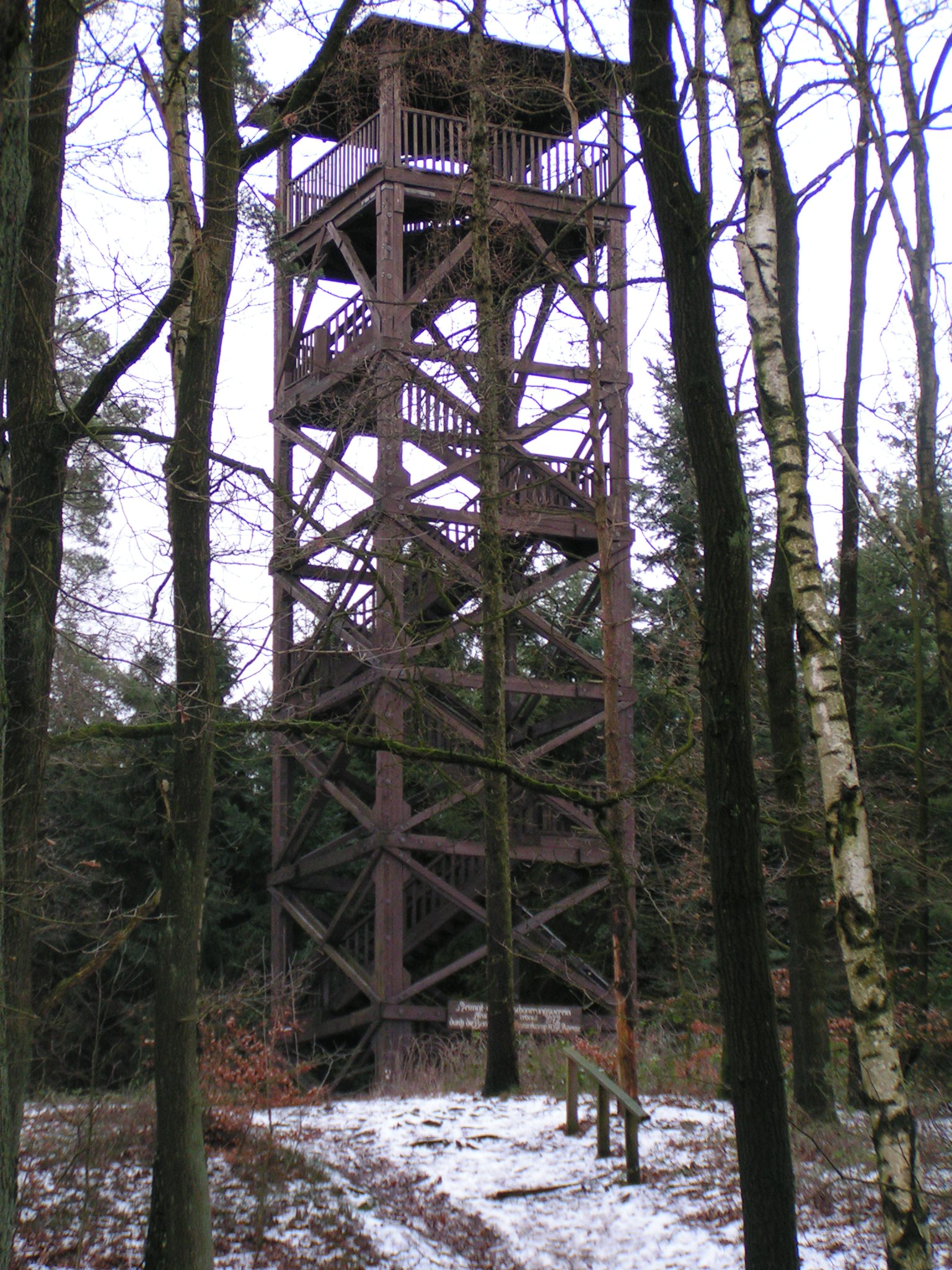
Steigenberg observation tower

Amongst the places of interest in the Damme Hills, aside from the woods themselves, are the observation towers of the Steigenberg (southwestern area of the ridge) and Mordkuhlenberg (north central area). From the latter there is a view over much of the ridge, the Dümmer Nature Park, Oldenburg Münsterland, the Wiehen Hills and Lake Dümmer. A nature trail on the Damme Bergsee gives information about animals and

== Hills ==
The highest elevations of the Damme Hills are (sorted by height in metres above sea level, NN, mainly based on):

- Signalberg 146 m; highest point in the Oldenburg Münsterland; with transmitter mast and telecommunication tower − between Damme and Steinfeld
- Mordkuhlenberg (142 m; with observation tower) − between Damme and Steinfeld
- Kattenberg (125.7 m) − west of Damme
- Spröckelnberg (121 m) − west of Damme
- Kreuzberg (117 m) − west of Damme
- Wellenberg (116.3 m) − west of Damme
- Hülseberg (116 m) − west of Damme
- Bökenberg (114 m) − southeast of Steinfeld
- Steigenberg (107.1 m; with observation tower) − east of Neuenkirchen
- Osterberg (97.2 m) − south of Langenberg
- Voßkuhlenberg (88 m) − west of Damme-Haverbeck
- Steinberg (85.2 m) − southwest of Damme-Haverbeck

== Waterbodies ==
The waterbodies of the Damme Hills include:
Lakes

- Damme Bergsee (25 ha; in the centre of the ridge)

Rivers

- Hunte (passes the ridge to the east, western tributary of the Weser)
- Hase (passes the ridge to the west, eastern tributary of the Ems)

== Towers ==
There are observation towers on the Mordkuhlenberg and Steigenberg. There is a Bundeswehr-owned transmitter mast on the Signalberg and, on its northern slopes, is a 134 m high Deutsche Telekom telecommunication tower.
