= Strothe (Lohne) =

River in Germany

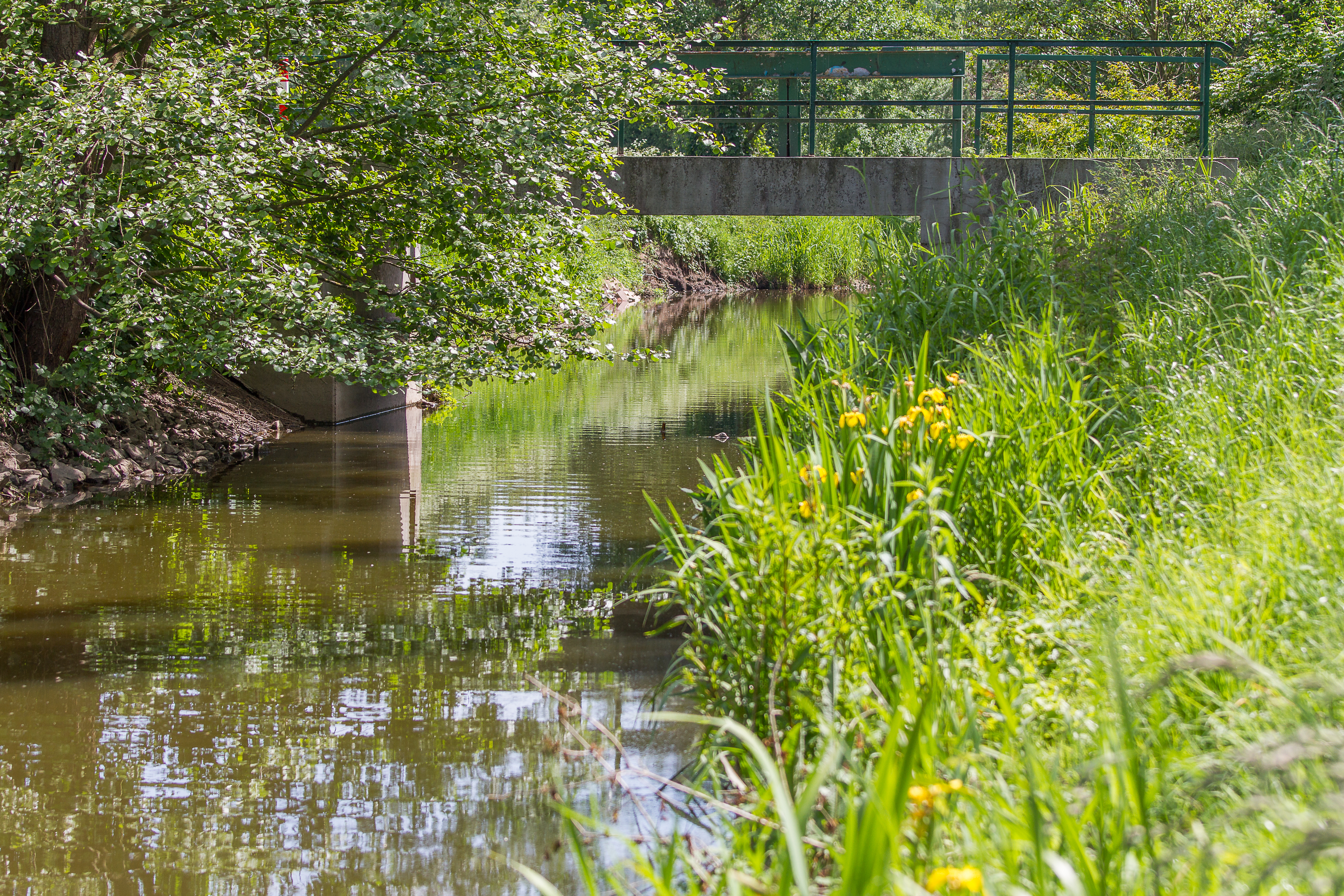

Location
- Country: Germany
- State: Lower Saxony

Physical characteristics
- Source
  - location: branch of the Lohne
  - coordinates: 52.5893°N 8.3767°E
- Mouth
  - location: Grawiede
  - coordinates: 52.6179°N 8.3856°E

Basin features
- Progression: Grawiede→ Hunte→ Weser→ North Sea

Strothe is a small river of Lower Saxony, Germany. It branches off the Lohne and flows into the Grawiede near Diepholz. Lohne and Grawiede are both tributaries of the Hunte.

== Course ==
The 3.74-km-long Strothe runs exclusively within the city limits of Diepholz. It branches off in an eastern direction from the Lohne River, southeast of the city center of Diepholz, then flows east of the Deutsche Bahn railway line and passes under the Federal Highway 214. Northeast of the city center of Diepholz, near the municipal yard and the sewage treatment plant, it flows into the Grawiede on the left side.

== See also ==
- List of rivers of Lower Saxony
