= Grawiede =

River in Germany

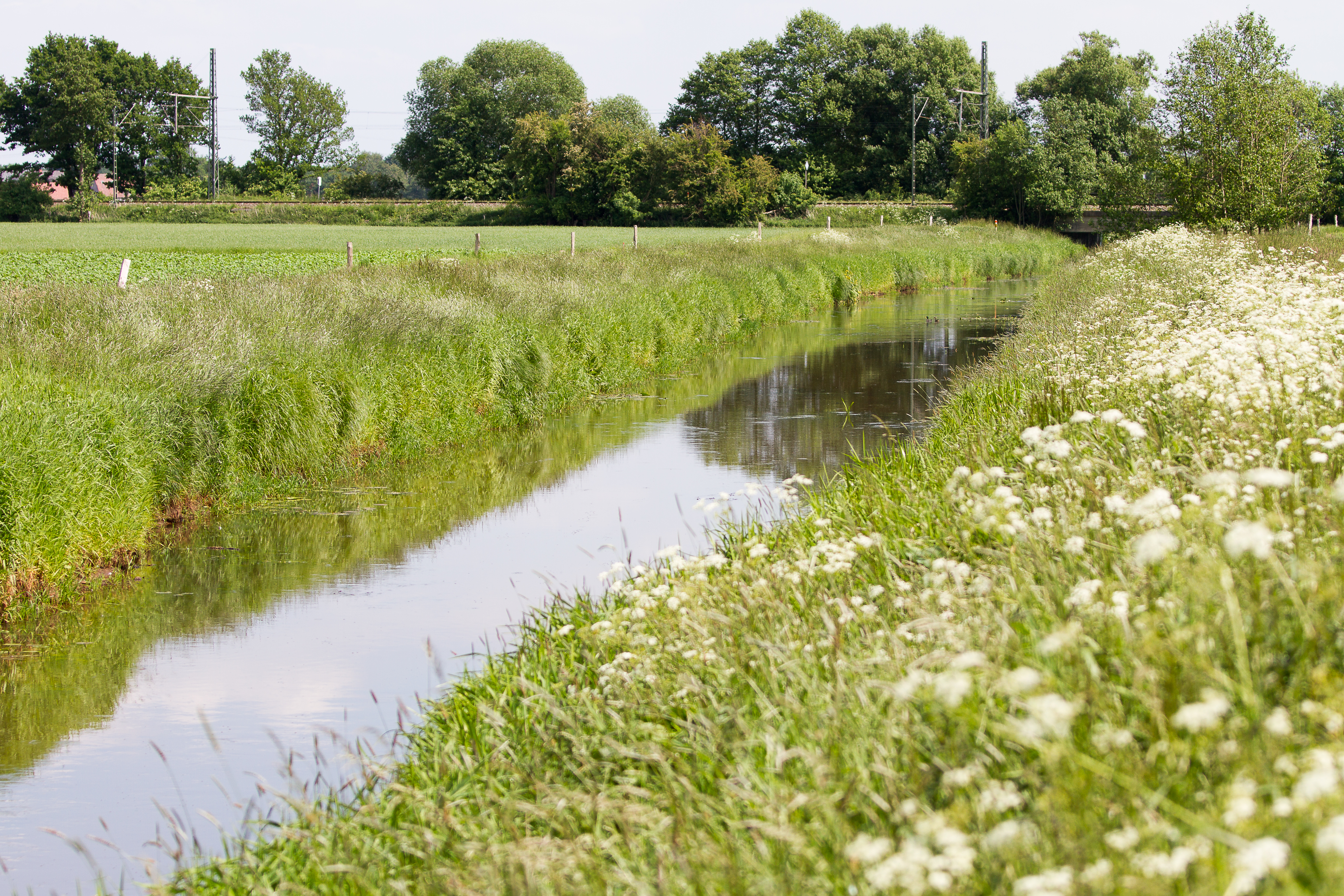

Location
- Country: Germany
- State: Lower Saxony

Physical characteristics
- Mouth
  - location: Hunte
  - coordinates: 52.6400°N 8.3781°E
- Length: 17.2 km (10.7 mi)

Basin features
- Progression: Hunte→ Weser→ North Sea

Grawiede is a river of Lower Saxony, Germany. It is one of the outflows of the lake Dümmer, and it flows into the Hunte near Diepholz.

== Course ==
The 17 km long Grawiede runs exclusively between the Lower Saxony inland lake Dümmer and the Lower Saxony district town of Diepholz. It originates from the Dümmer, specifically on its eastern side in Lembruch, then flows in a northerly direction east of Federal Highway 214, east of the Lohne River, and the Deutsche Bahn railway line Lemförde-Diepholz.

Northeast of the city center of Diepholz, it receives the Strothe River on the left side, which was previously diverted from the Lohne. The Grawiede itself flows through the Diepholz district of Heede and finally flows into the Hunte to the north.

The Grawiede has a catchment area of approximately 185 square kilometers, of which 7.24 square kilometers were declared as floodplains in 2007.

== See also ==
- List of rivers of Lower Saxony
