= Wätering =

River in Germany

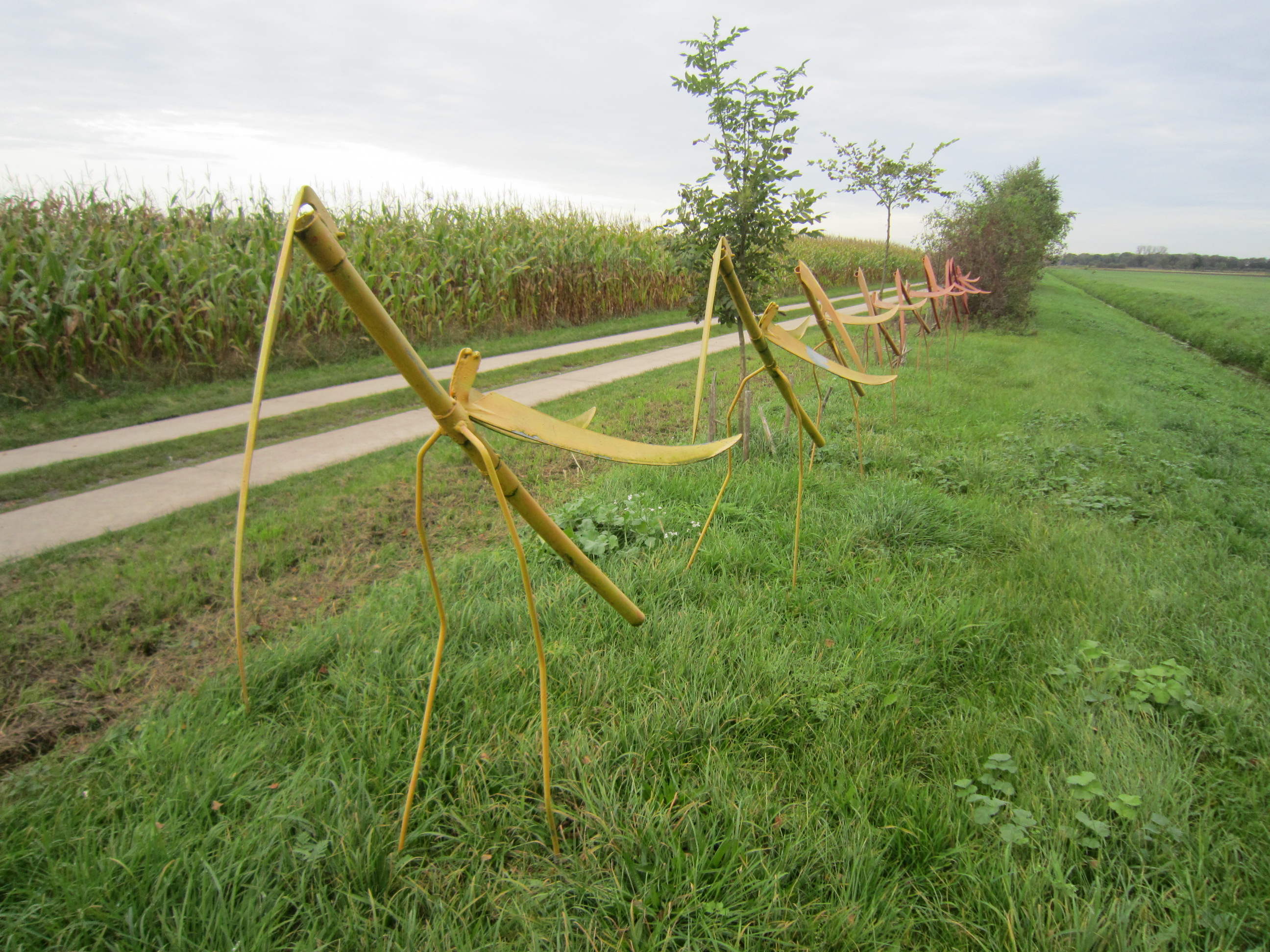
- Metal sculpture at the sculpture walk "Diepholz-Dümmer"; on the right side the Wätering

Location
- Country: Germany
- State: Lower Saxony

Physical characteristics
- Mouth
  - location: Hunte
  - coordinates: 52.5893°N 8.3565°E

Basin features
- Progression: Hunte→ Weser→ North Sea

Wätering is a small river of Lower Saxony, Germany. It is one of the outflows of the lake Dümmer, and it flows into the Hunte near Diepholz.

== Course ==
The approximately 7 km long Wätering runs exclusively between the Lower Saxony inland lake Dümmer and the Lower Saxony district town of Diepholz. It originates from the Dümmer, specifically its northern side near the Lembruch district of Eickhöpen (in the joint municipality Altes Amt Lemförde), then flows in a northerly direction west of Federal Highway 51 and occasionally - in the Graftlage area - directly alongside it. In this area, immediately to the west of it, along a field path, the sculpture trail "Diepholz Dümmer" is located. South of the city center of Diepholz, near the Fliegerhorst Airfield, the Wätering flows into the Hunte, which then continues to flow in a northerly direction.

== See also ==
- List of rivers of Lower Saxony
