= Kollwesshöh =

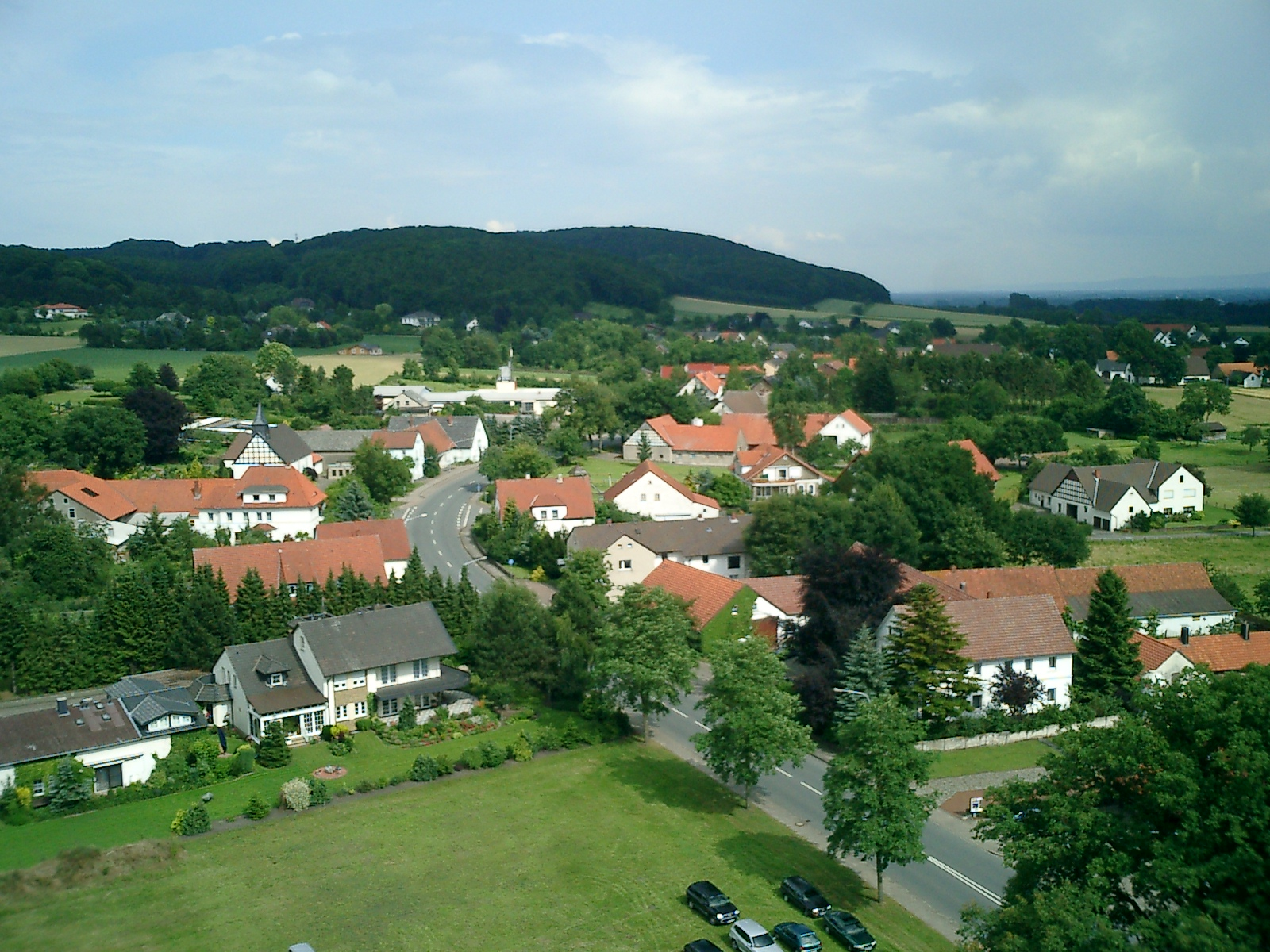
- The Kollwesshöh (rear right peak) viewed from Haldem; left of it is the Scharfe Berg.

Highest point
- Elevation: 181.4 m above sea level (NN) (595 ft)
- Listing: highest point in the North German Plain north of the Bückeberge
- Coordinates: 52°26′07″N 8°26′02″E

Geography
- Location within North Rhine-Westphalia
- Location: North Rhine-Westphalia, Germany
- Parent range: Stemweder Berg

The Kollwesshöh is, at 181.4 m above sea level (NN), the highest hill in the Stemweder Berg, the smallest and northernmost range of the Central Uplands in Germany, and also the highest point in the North German Plain north of the Bückeberge. It is located in the district of Minden-Lübbecke in the German state of North Rhine-Westphalia. To the west-northwest is its neighbour, the Scharfer Berg, which is almost as high.

== Origin of the name ==
The name of the hill comprises two parts: Kollwess and höh.
The first stems from the fact that the land on which the hill lies used to belong to the Kohlwes family in Wehdem. The second part is related to Höhe, the German word for "height". As a result of transcription errors between maps in the 19th century there were various versions of the name, but eventually the name Kollwesshöh was settled on.

== Location ==
The Kollwesshöh is part of the Stemweder Berg which in turn lies within the Dümmer Nature Park. It is also north of Westrup, a parish in the southern part of the municipality of Stemwede.

The Kollwesshöh may be accessed, for example, from Westrup by taking forest tracks heading northwest that link it with the Scharfer Berg.

== History ==
Just under 1 kilometre north of the Kollwesshöh on the White Way (Weißer Weg) is a Bronze Age tumulus that is worth seeing.
