= Berne (Ollen) =

River in Germany

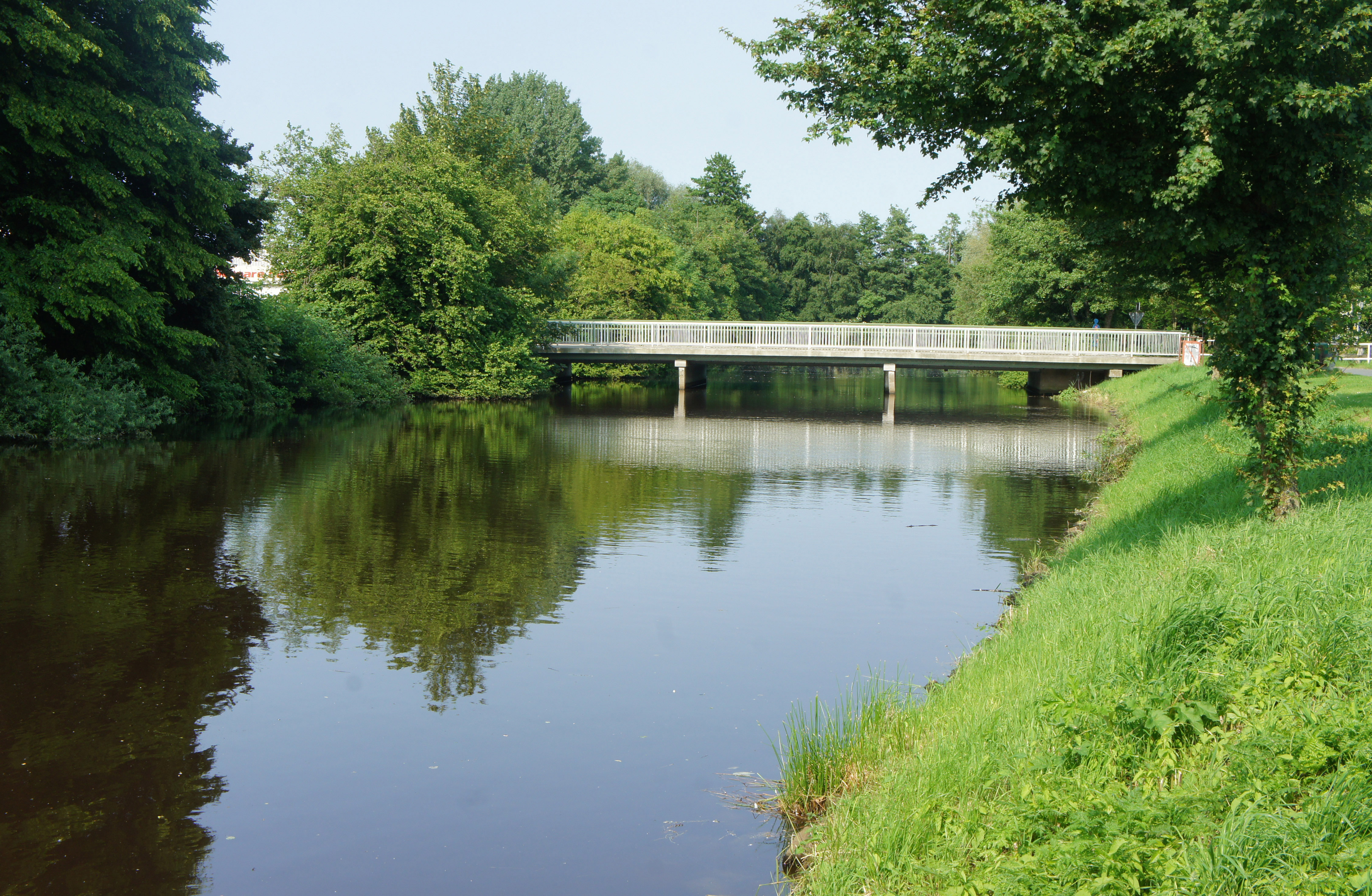

Location
- Country: Germany
- State: Lower Saxony

Physical characteristics
- Mouth
  - location: Ollen
  - coordinates: 53.1807°N 8.4879°E

Basin features
- Progression: Ollen→ Hunte→ Weser→ North Sea

Berne (German pronunciation: [ˈbɛʁnə]) is a river of Lower Saxony, Germany. It flows into the Ollen in the village Berne.

== See also ==
- List of rivers of Lower Saxony
