= Klatte =

Klatte is a surname of German origin. Notable people with the name include:

- Fritz Klatte (1880–1934), German chemist and the discoverer of polyvinyl acetate, with German patent
- Wilhelm Klatte (1870–1930), German music theoretician, pedagogue, journalist and conductor
