= Dümmer =

Lake in Lower Saxony, Germany

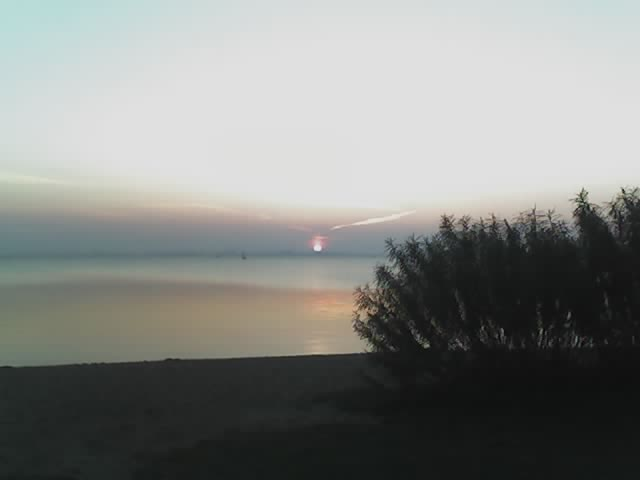
- at sunset

- Location within Lower Saxony Location within Germany
- Location: Lower Saxony
- Coordinates: 52°30′N 8°21′E
- Primary inflows: Hunte
- Primary outflows: Hunte
- Basin countries: Germany
- Surface area: 13.5 km^{2} (5.2 sq mi)
- Average depth: 1 m (3 ft 3 in)
- Max. depth: 1.5 m (4 ft 11 in)
- Surface elevation: 37 m (121 ft)
- Settlements: Lembruch, Hüde, Damme

Ramsar Wetland
- Designated: 26 February 1976
- Reference no.: 85

The Dümmer (German pronunciation: [ˈdʏmɐ]) or officially Dümmer See is a large lake in southern Lower Saxony (Germany). It has a surface of 13.5 km^{2} and an average depth of one metre. Its elevation is 37 metres.

Dümmer is a popular resort for water sports, but also an important biotope for water birds and located in a zone especially frequented by migratory birds. A large section of its shore is protected by nature reserve areas.

== Etymology ==
The word "diummeri" is first attested in 965. „Dümmer“ is probably derived from "dummerig", meaning moist or shaded, and "Meer“, meaning sea. In northwestern Germany, "Meer" is the traditional term for still waters surrounded by marshes (see: "Steinhuder Meer" and "Zwischenahner Meer"). Possibly, there is also a connection between Dümmer and the southern Dutch word „doom“ ("mist", "broom").

The Dümmersee: Diummeri … westphalian for dumb, moist, damp (regarding land), norwegian dumma, unclear air, misty corner. The second part is meri, the land sea.

— Hermann Jellinghaus

== Location ==
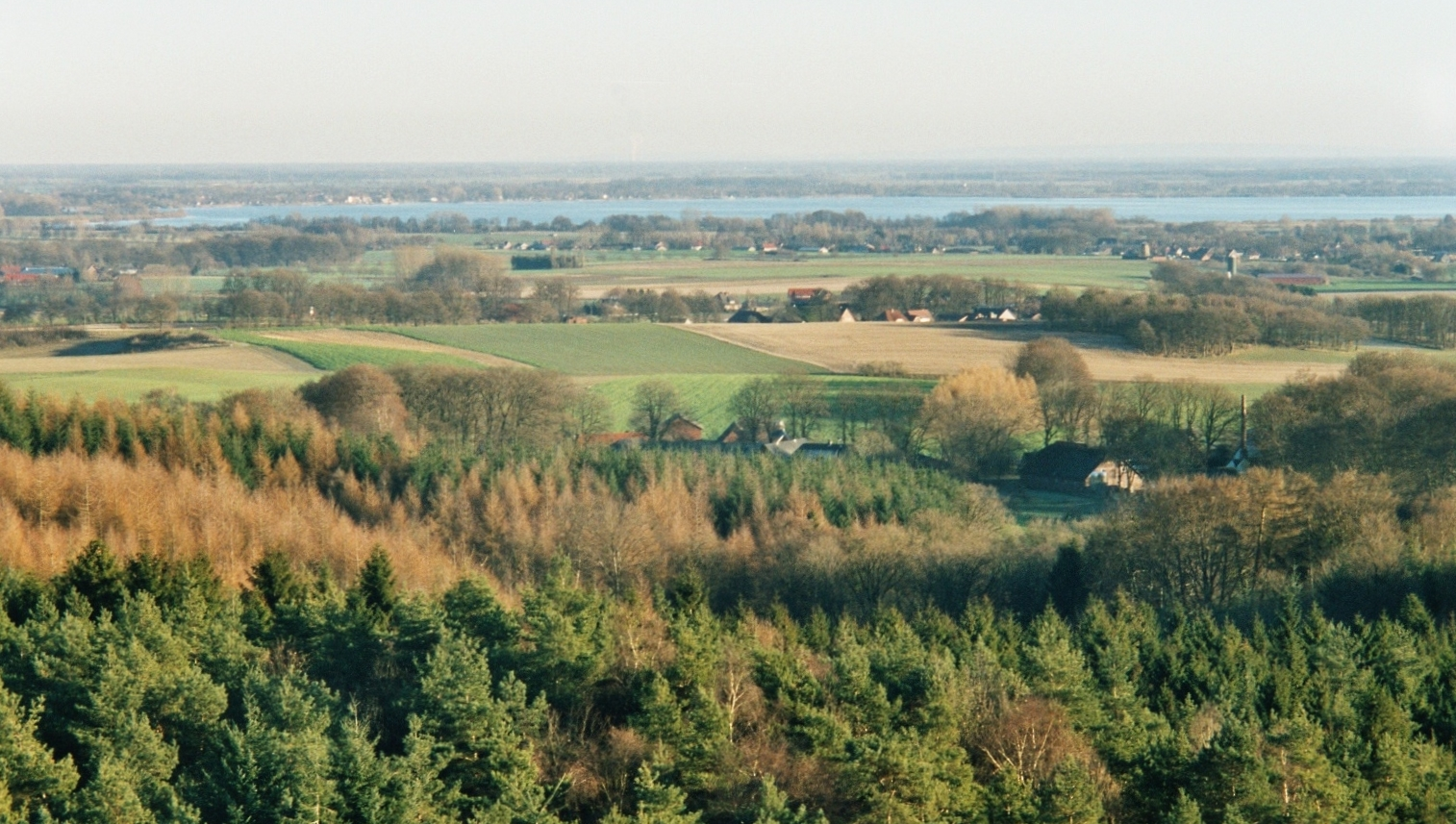
View of the Dümmer from Mordkuhlenberg eastwards over the Dammer Berge

The Dümmer is located in the 300-acre (1.2 km^{2}) Dümmer depression. One and a half miles to the west, the Damme Hills begin to rise, eventually reaching a height of 145 m. Around the lake are fens (Niedermoore) and raised bogs (Hochmoore). The lake lies in the Dümmer Nature Park, which is just under 500 km^{2} in area, and in which the Damme Hills and Stemweder Berg form the central elements of the landscape.

The open water of the lake belongs entirely to the district of Diepholz, but on its western shore the district of Vechta extends up to the dyke foreland. Near Dümmerlohausen the district boundary comes within a few metres of the shoreline. To the southwest by the mouth of the River Hunte a tip of the territory of the district of Osnabrück advances to within half a kilometre of the lake. Whilst Diepholz district belonged to the Electorate of Hanover from 1585 (County of Diepholz) and 1582 (County of Hoya), the territory of the district of Vechta belonged for centuries to the Diocese of Münster and only became part of Oldenburg in 1803 after the German Mediatisation. Hence it counts as part of Oldenburg Münsterland.

== Character ==
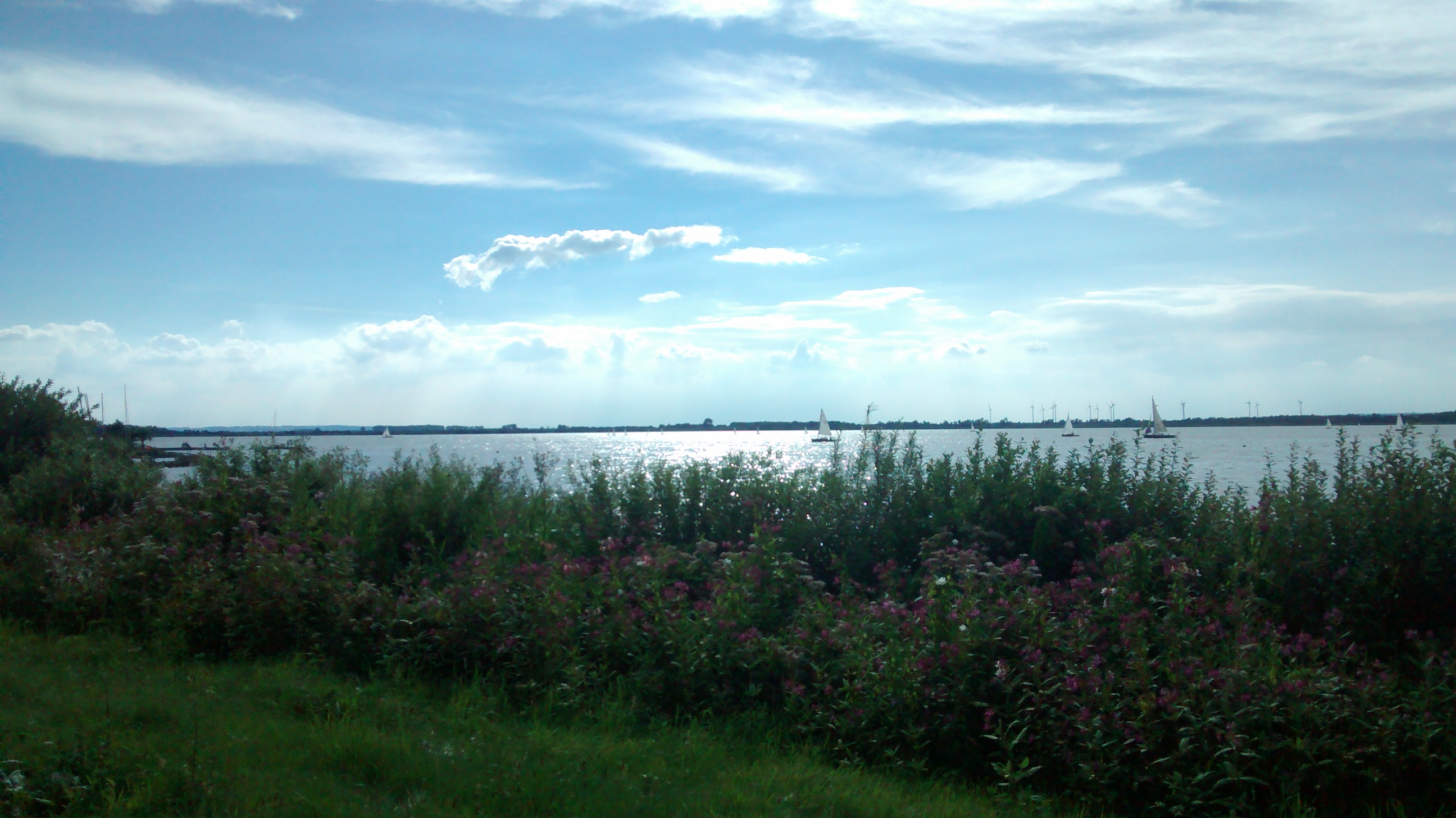
Dümmer Lake Sideview

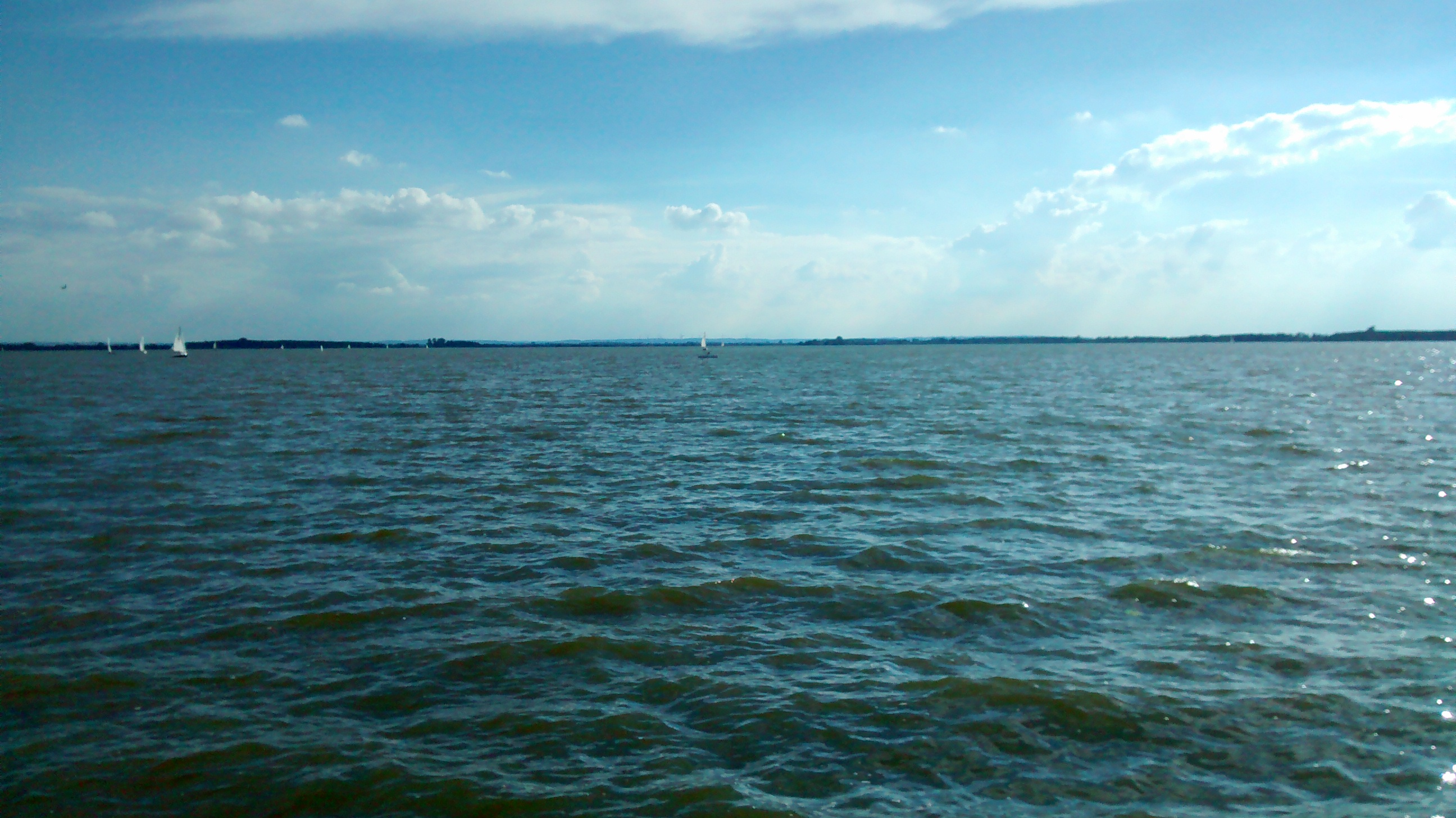
Dümmer Lake

The Dümmer is, after the Steinhuder Meer, the second largest lake in Lower Saxony. With its water surface of 13.5 km ² - the area within the ring dyke including siltation zones is 16 km ² - and maximum water depth of just 1.50 m, it is good for swimming and water sports. The shallow lake with its flat beaches on the western and eastern shore is up to 5 km long from north to south and up to 3.4 km wide from west to east.

The lake is crossed by the River Hunte, which leaves the lake via several branches, the largest of which is not called the "Hunte" but the Lohne. Other branches are the Grawiede and the artificial Wätering, the Dorflohne, Schoddenlohne and Ompteda Canal. Only 13 km north of the lake and 3 km north of Diepholz all the branches of the Hunte are reunited.

The fish-filled lake, which is also a breeding and resting place for birds, has a variety of flora and fauna, which is why the western and the southern shore of the lake are largely protected.

Although the lake is only about a metre deep on average, very rich water sources and the Hunte itself ensure that its water level is relatively constant. Previously these headstreams combined with regular heavy rainfall to cause flooding, so that in the 1940s work began to build dykes around the lake. In the period 1941-1945 foreign forced labour was used for this on a large scale. The reclamation and subsequent lack of annual flooding resulted in algae growing in large quantities in the lake and hence depriving most other organisms of oxygen. The low water level was caused by heavy silting, also a result of dyking the lake. With the help of several locks it was possible to control the high water levels artificially without greatly interfering with nature. Nevertheless, the Dümmer suffers from heavy nutrient pollution caused by intensive agriculture.

The remains of New Stone Age settlements have been found on the shores of the Dümmer.

== Sources ==
- Friedrich, Ernst Andreas (1980). Naturdenkmale Niedersachsens. Hanover. ISBN 3-7842-0227-6
- Helbig, Andreas J., Ludwig, Jürgen and Belting, Heinrich (1990). Die Vögel des Dümmer-Gebietes. Avifauna eines norddeutschen Flachsees und seiner Umgebung (Naturschutz und Landschaftspflege in Niedersachsen 21). Hanover
- Klohn, Werner (1992). Probleme der Raumgestaltung in der Dümmerniederung Vechta
- Klohn, Werner (1986). Verbreitung, Struktur und Funktion der Kleinstwälder und Gehölze in der Dümmerniederung und ihren Randgebieten Vechta
- Klugmann, Ulrike and Villwock, Ingeborg (1984). Dümmer und Wiehengebirge (Naturmagazin "Draußen", Heft 35). Hamburg
- Sanden-Guja, Walter (1960). Der große Binsensee. 2nd expanded edition, Stuttgart
- Schmidt, Arno (1955). Seelandschaft mit Pocahontas. Erzählung.
- Seehafer, Klaus (1980). Der Dümmer See in Farbe. Ein Reiseführer für Naturfreunde. Stuttgart
