= Dümmer Nature Park =

Coordinates: 52°31.25724′N 8°19.45152′E

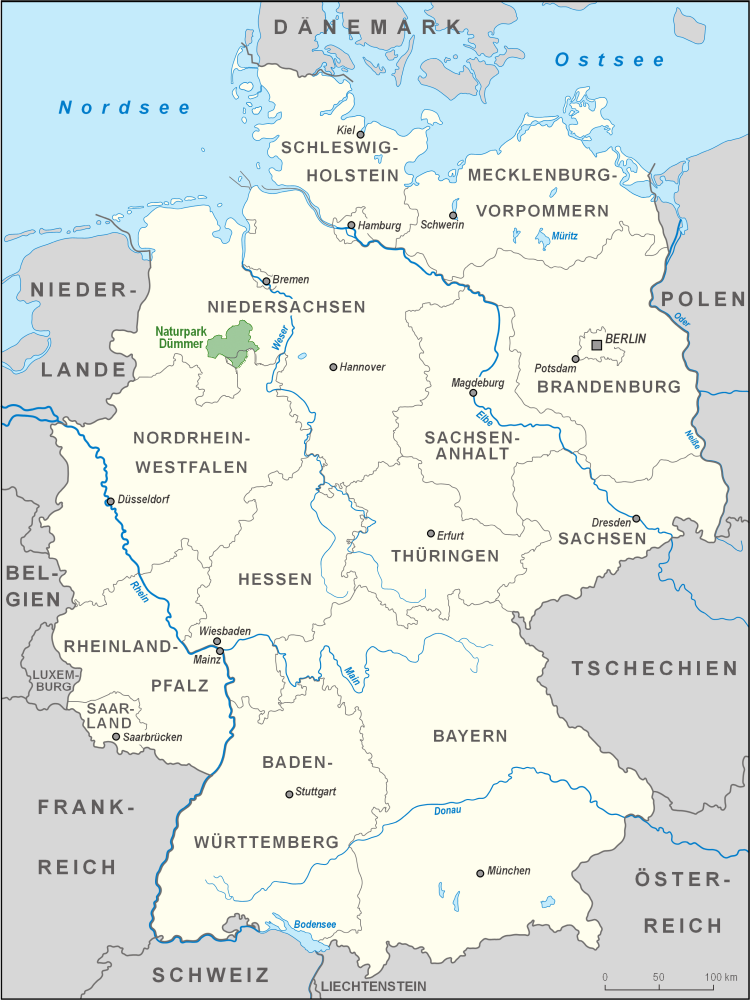
Location of the nature park within Germany

The Dümmer Nature Park (German: Naturpark Dümmer) in North Germany is located in the Lower Saxon districts of Diepholz and Vechta and the North Rhine-Westphalian district of Minden-Lübbecke. It is about 34 kilometres (21 mi) northeast of Osnabrück and lies between Diepholz and Bohmte, Bersenbrück and Rahden.

The nature park covers an area of almost 500 square kilometres (190 sq mi) and is bisected from north to south by the Weser-Ems watershed. Within the boundary of its protected landscape are the Damme Hills, the Dümmer lake (the focus of the nature park), the Stemweder Hills and numerous bogs such as the Großes Moor and the Oppenweher Moor).

The Dümmer Nature Park and the Dümmer Lake in particular is a breeding and resting site for many migrating birds. Numerous water ditches as well as the Hunte cross the park area. The extensive raised bogs have a unique flora and fauna. Discoveries from the New Stone Age indicate that people were attracted here in prehistoric times by the fertile soils and even settled here.

== See also ==
- List of nature parks in Germany
