= Signalberg (Damme) =

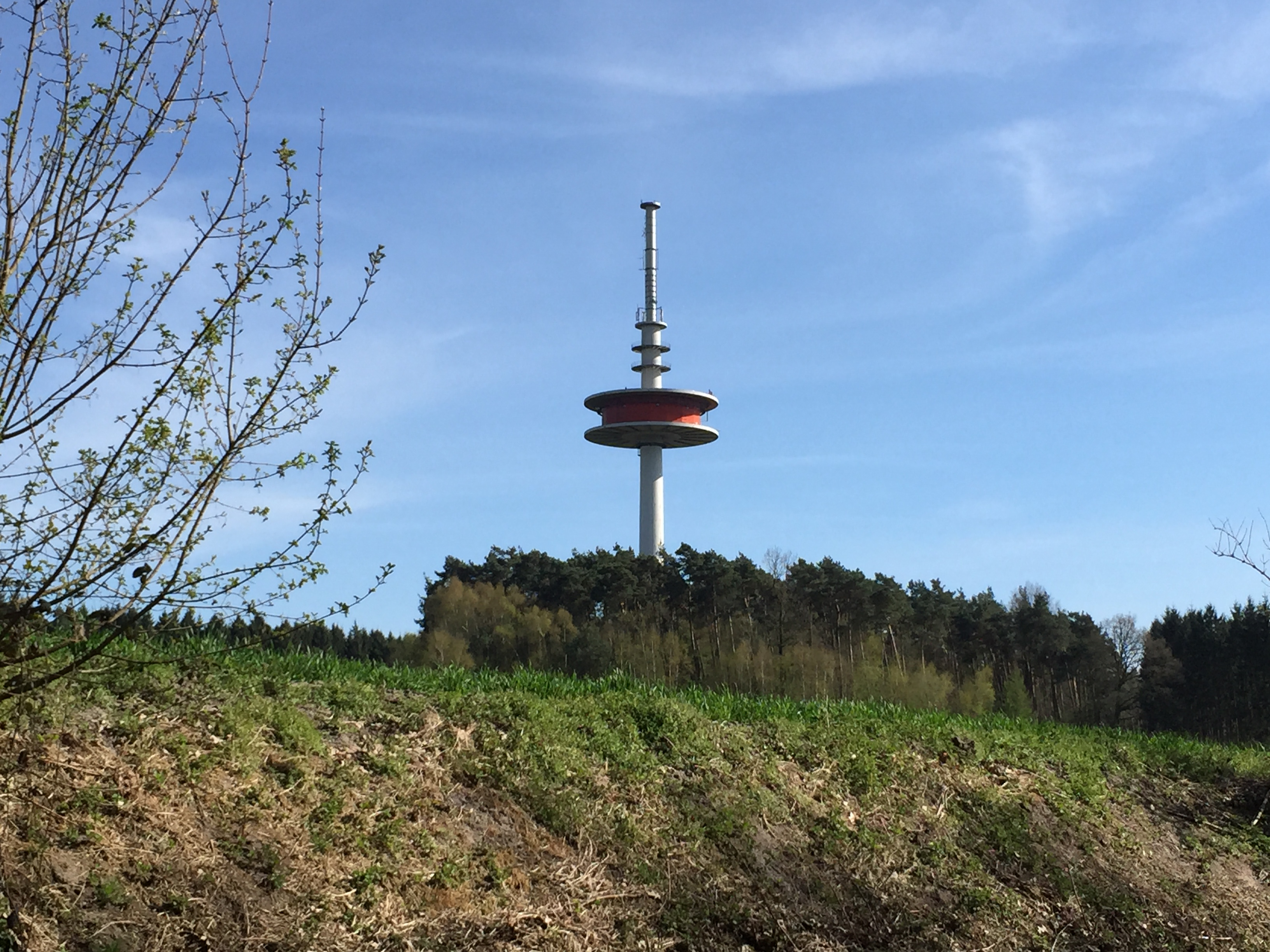
- Dammer Berge telecommunications tower on Signalberg

Highest point
- Elevation: 146 m above sea level (NHN) (479 ft)
- Coordinates: 52°33′10″N 8°12′40″E

Geography
- Location within Lower Saxony
- Location: Vechta district, Lower Saxony, Germany
- Parent range: Damme Hills

The Signalberg is, at 146 m above sea level (NN), the highest elevation in the Damme Hills and Oldenburg Münsterland. It rises in the district of Vechta in the north German state of Lower Saxony. The name means "beacon hill".
