= Jürgen Krogmann =

German politician

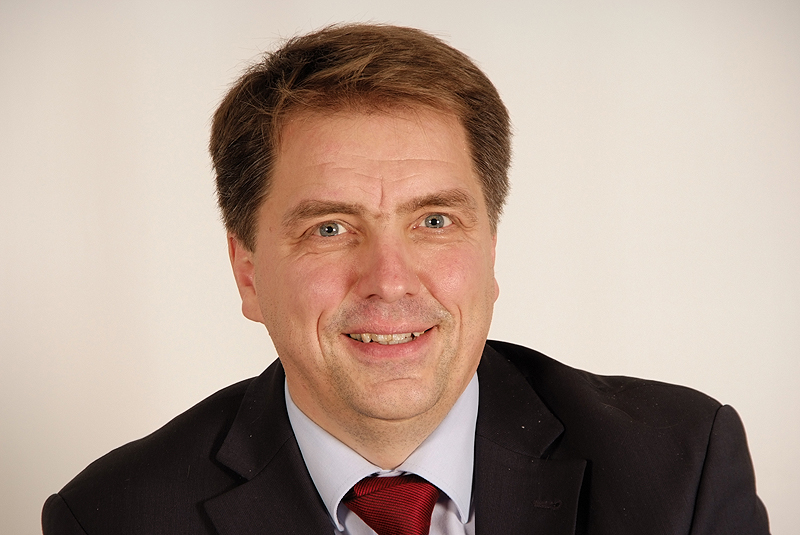
- Jürgen Krogmann in 2009

Mayor of Oldenburg
- Incumbent
- Assumed office 2014
- Preceded by: Gerd Schwandner

Member of the Landtag of Lower Saxony for Oldenburg North/West
- In office 2008–2014

Personal details
- Born: 14 November 1963 (age 62) Steinfeld, West Germany
- Party: Social Democratic Party of Germany (1987-present)
- Education: University of Oldenburg
- Occupation: Politician

Jürgen Krogmann (born 14 November 1963), is a German politician for the Social Democratic Party of Germany (SPD). He was a member of the Landtag of Lower Saxony from 2008 to 2014, and since November 2014 has been the mayor of Oldenburg.

== Early life and education ==
Krogmann was born in Steinfeld. After finishing school, he did alternative civilian service and then studied history, German language and literature and politics in Cologne and Oldenburg.

== Career ==
In 1987, he joined the SPD and was appointed to the board of the SPD local association in the northern district of Oldenburg.

From 1989 to 1993, Krogmann was a radio reporter and presenter for Norddeutscher Rundfunk in Oldenburg. In 1993 he became spokesperson for the city of Oldenburg, then in 2006 head of the city's department of "planning information and citizen participation" until entering the state Landtag in 2008.

In the state election in 2008, Krogmann was elected to the state Landtag with a relative majority in constituency 63, Oldenburg-Nord/West (North/West). He became spokesperson for the SPD faction on issues of local government and also ports and shipping. In the 2013 election, he again won his constituency outright.

Since 2011, he has also been involved in local politics in Oldenburg. He received the highest majority in the election for the city council, where among other activities he sat on the Committee on Economic Development and chaired the Schools Committee.

In October 2014, he was elected mayor of Oldenburg and resigned his seat in the Landtag, where he was succeeded by Luzia Moldenhauer.

== Personal life ==
Krogmann is married and has three children. He is a member of ver.di and the Workers' Welfare Association.
