= Lethe (Hunte) =

River in Germany

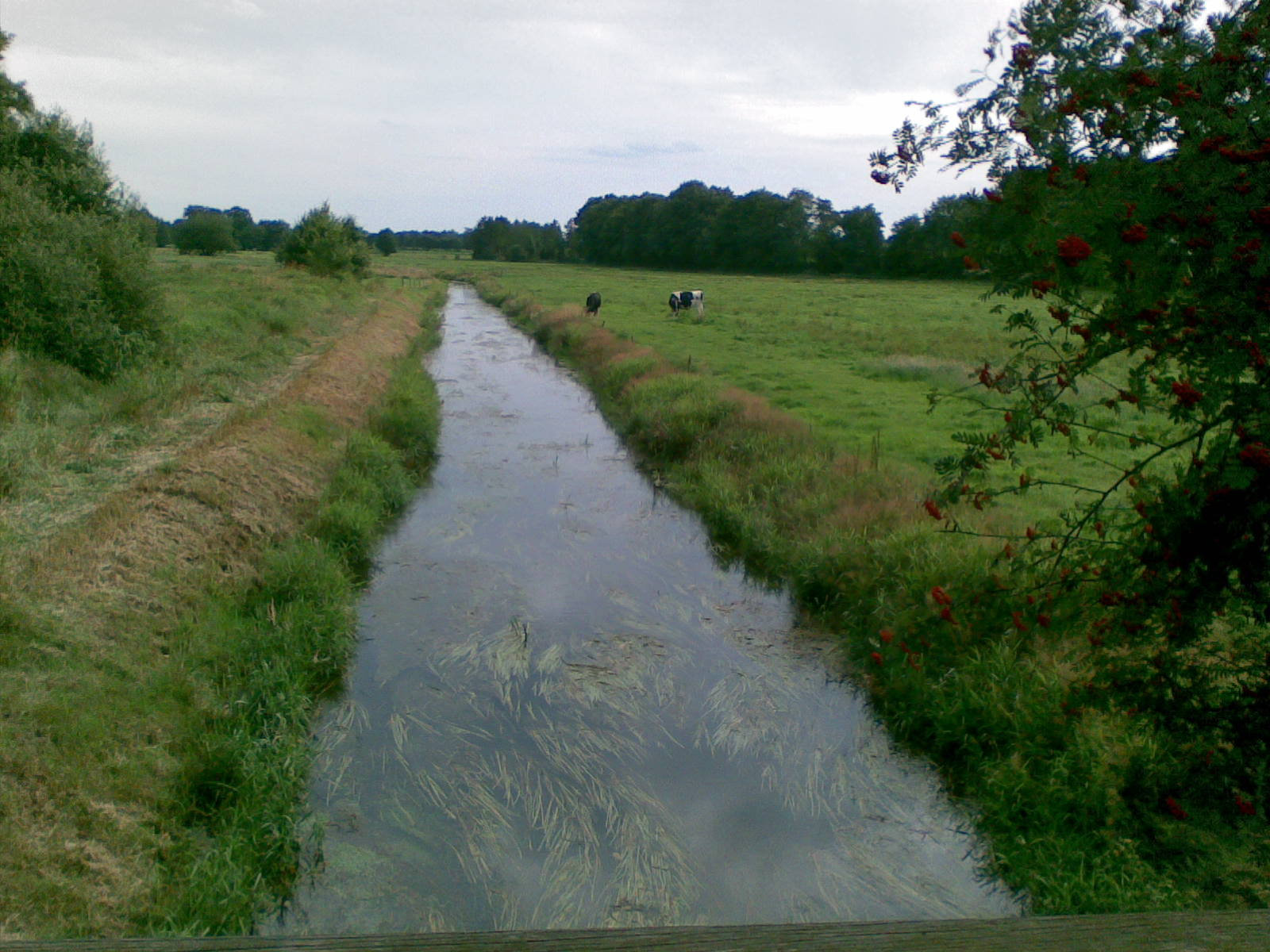

Location
- Country: Germany
- State: Lower Saxony

Physical characteristics
- Mouth
  - location: Osternburger Kanal
  - coordinates: 53.1°N 8.2°E
- Length: 36.8 km (22.9 mi)
- Basin size: 179 km^{2} (69 sq mi)

Basin features
- Progression: Hunte→ Weser→ North Sea

Lethe is a river of Lower Saxony, Germany. It flows into the Hunte through the Osternburger Kanal in Wardenburg.

== See also ==
- List of rivers of Lower Saxony
