= Theodor Hillenhinrichs =

German politician (1901–1990)

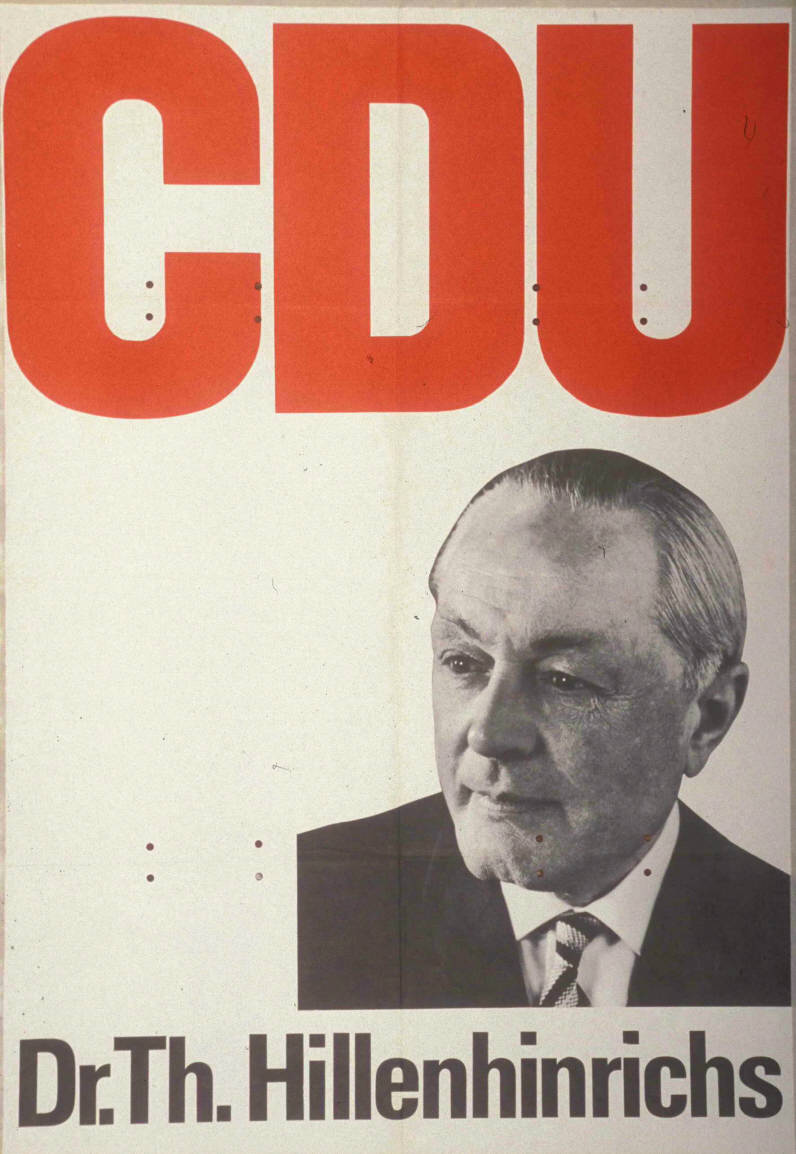
- Hillenhinrichs on an election poster for the parliamentary elections in 1965
- Born: 5 March 1901; Damme, Grand Duchy of Oldenburg, German Empire
- Died: 27 May 1990 (aged 89)
- Occupation: Politician
- Political party: Christian Democratic Union

Theodor Hillenhinrichs (5 March 1901 – 27 May 1990) was a German politician from the Christian Democratic Union. From 15 March 1965 to 23 July 1966 he served as member of the Landtag of North Rhine-Westphalia.

== Life and career ==
After attending elementary school and gymnasium, he studied at the Technical Universities in Aachen and Berlin. During his studies, he was a member of the Catholic student fraternities KStV Carolingia Aachen and KStV Burgundia Berlin within the KV.

Starting in 1926, he worked in the Ruhr mining district. He held various positions including Steiger (mining overseer), operations manager, industrial engineer, operations director, and mine director. He joined the NSDAP on May 1, 1933 (membership number 2,207,983).

In 1952, he became a member of the CDU and was active in numerous party committees.

== Parliamentary career ==
From March 15, 1965, to July 23, 1966, Hillenhinrichs was a member of the Landtag of North Rhine-Westphalia. He entered the parliament during its fifth legislative period via his party's reserve list.
