= Gerd Schwandner =

German surgeon and politician

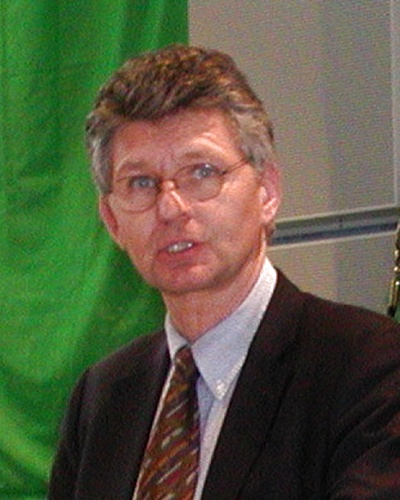
- Schwandner in 2008

Mayor of Oldenburg
- In office 1 October 2006 – 31 October 2014
- Preceded by: Dietmar Schütz
- Succeeded by: Jürgen Krogmann

Member of the Landtag of Baden-Württemberg
- In office 25 March 1984 – 21 January 1992
- Constituency: Green List

Personal details
- Born: 22 May 1951 (age 75) Göppingen, West Germany
- Party: FDP (1970s); Greens (1980s–2005); Independent (since 2005)
- Other political affiliations: CDU (2006–2014)
- Education: Heidelberg University
- Occupation: Politician

Gerd Schwandner (born 22 May 1951) is a German surgeon and former politician. He was mayor of Oldenburg from 2006 to 2014.

== Background and education ==
Schwandner was born in Göppingen, Baden Württemberg, and studied medicine in Düsseldorf and Heidelberg. From 1977 to 1984 he worked at the university hospital of Heidelberg and later in Pforzheim.

== Politics ==
At first Schwandner was a member of the liberal FDP. He left the party to join the Greens in the 1980s. In 1984 he became member of the Landtag of Baden-Württemberg. Eventually Schwandner was appointed deputy leader of his political group in parliament, serving for six years in this office. After he was reelected in 1988, he moved to the city of Bremen in 1992, where he became council of state. He left the Greens in 2005.

== Mayor of Oldenburg ==
During the 2006 lord mayor elections in Oldenburg, Schwandner, now independent, was candidate of the center-right CDU. He won the election, defeating incumbent mayor Dietmar Schütz (SPD). Schwandner was mayor of Oldenburg until 2014.
