= Zygfryd Kuchta =

Polish handball player (born 1944)

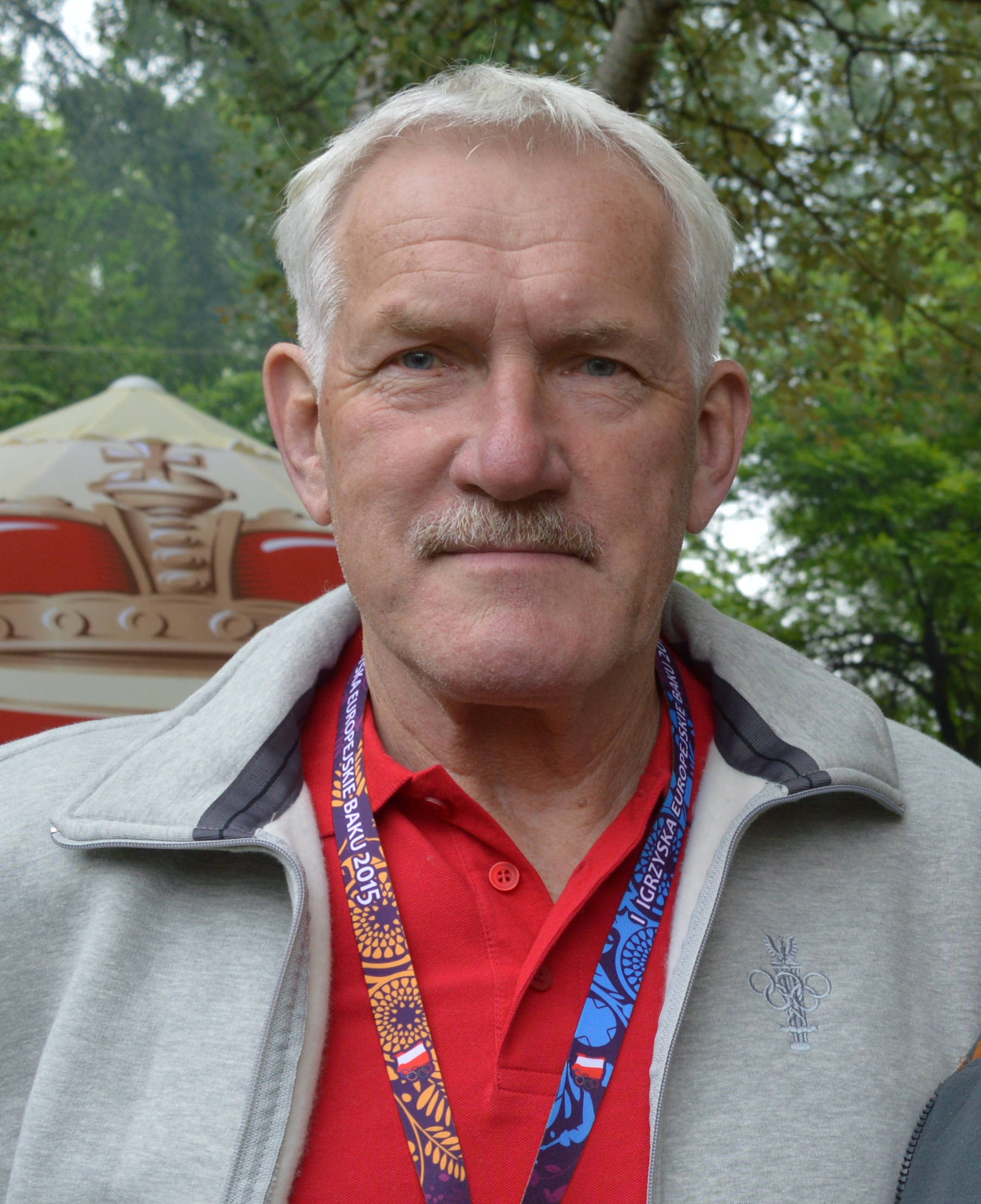

Personal information
- Nationality: Polish
- Born: 5 January 1944 (age 82) Diepholz, German Empire
- Height: 189 cm (74 in)

Sport
- Sport: Handball

Senior clubs
- Years: Team
- 1967-1968: Anilana Łódź
- 1968-1970: Spójnia Gdańsk
- 1970-1976: Anilana Łódź
- 1976-1979: ASKÖ Linz (Player-coach)
National team
Years	Team	Apps
1967-1976	Poland	142

Teams managed
- 1976-1979: ASKÖ Linz (Player-coach)
- 1980-1984: Anilana Łódź
- 1981-1984: Poland Men
- 1984-??: UAE Men
- –: Anilana Łódź
- –: ASKÖ Linz
- 2003-2006: Poland women
Medal record
Olympic Games
Bronze medal – third place	1976 Montreal	Team
World Championship
Bronze medal – third place	1982 Spain	Coach

Zygfryd Kuchta (born 5 January 1944 in Diepholz, Germany) is a former Polish handball player and coach who competed in the 1972 Summer Olympics and in the 1976 Summer Olympics. As a coach he has coached both the Poland women's and men's team. As the coach of the men's team he won bronze medals at the 1982 World Championship.

In 1972 he was part of the Polish team which finished tenth. He played all five matches and scored seven goals.

Four years later he won the bronze medal with the Polish team. He played all five matches and scored five goals.
