= Ollen =

River in Germany

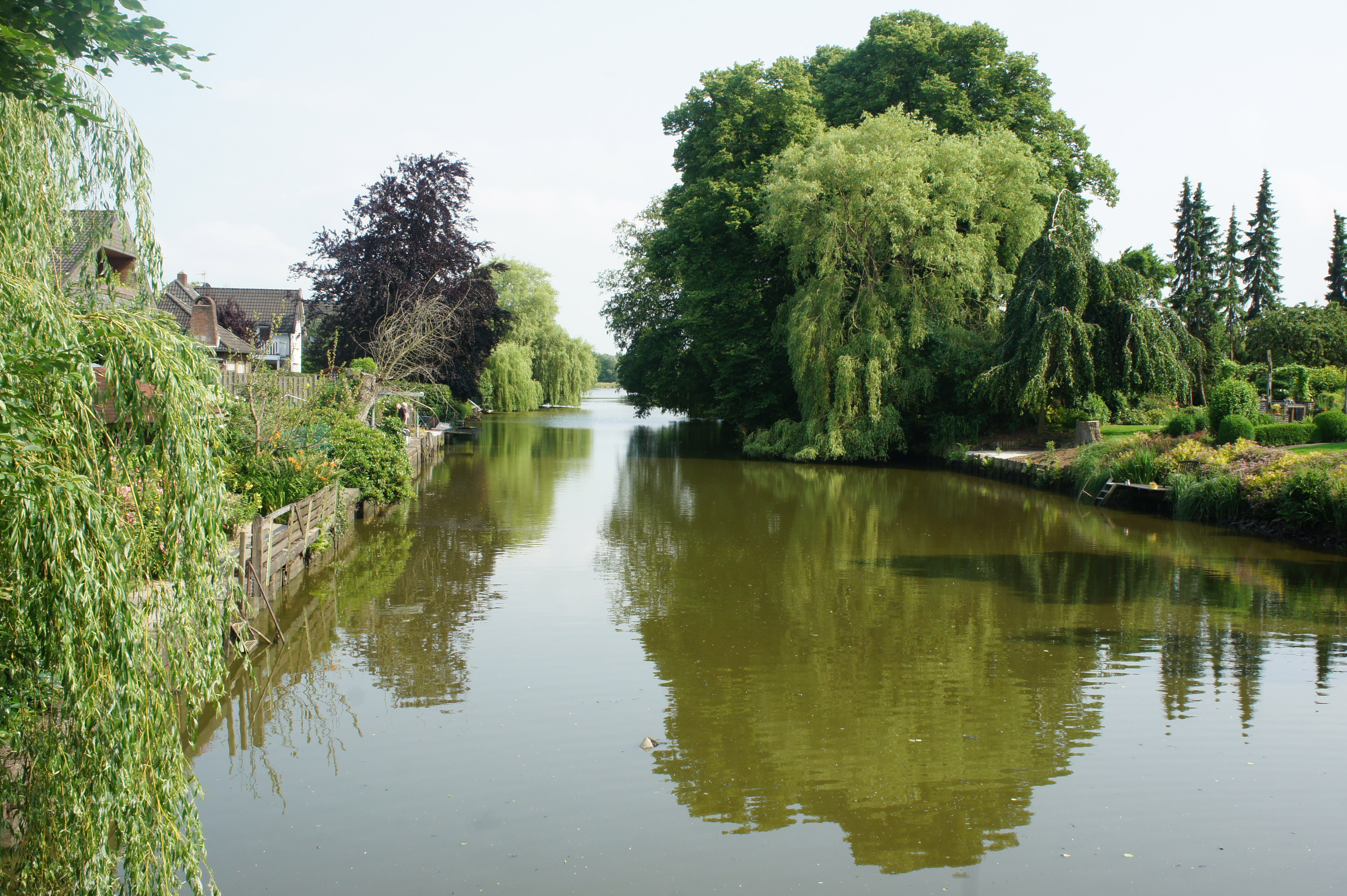
- The Ollen in Berne

Location
- Country: Germany
- State: Lower Saxony

Physical characteristics
- Mouth
  - location: Hunte
  - coordinates: 53.2043°N 8.4535°E

Basin features
- Progression: Hunte→ Weser→ North Sea

Ollen is a 17 km (11 mi) long river of Lower Saxony, Germany. It discharges into the Hunte through an old branch of the Hunte near Berne.

== See also ==
- List of rivers of Lower Saxony
