= Lohne (river) =

River in Germany

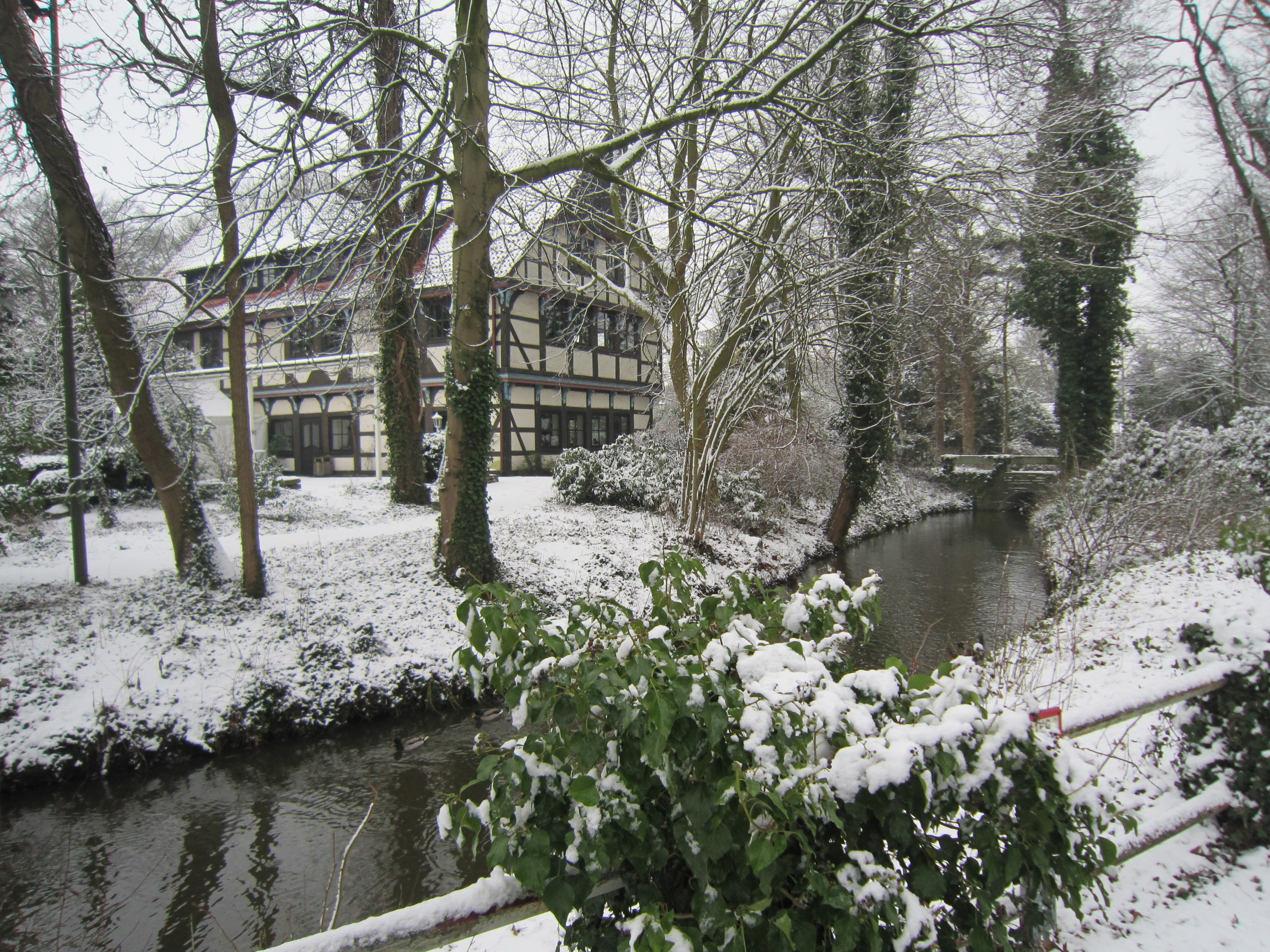

Location
- Country: Germany
- State: Lower Saxony

Physical characteristics
- Mouth
  - location: Hunte
  - coordinates: 52.6088°N 8.3605°E
- Length: 12.0 km (7.5 mi)

Basin features
- Progression: Hunte→ Weser→ North Sea

Lohne (German pronunciation: [ˈloːnə]) is a river of Lower Saxony, Germany. It is an influent of the river Hunte that springs from lake Dümmer and flows into river Hunte in Diepholz after 12.0 km (7.5 mi).

== See also ==
- List of rivers of Lower Saxony
