= Westrup =

Westrup is a surname. Notable people with the surname include,

- Brianna Westrup (born 1997), American footballer
- Caroline Westrup (born 1986), Norwegian-Swedish professional golfer
- Jack Westrup (1904–1975), English musicologist
- Kate Westrup (1885–1928), English artist
