= Fritz Klatte =

German chemist (1880–1934)

Fritz Klatte (28 March 1880, Diepholz – 11 February 1934) was a German chemist and the discoverer of polyvinyl acetate, with German patent (GP 281687 1912) for its preparation from acetylene gas.

Polyvinyl chloride (PVC) was discovered by French physicist Henri Victor Regnault, and German physicist Eugen Baumann. Klatte designed the production process, although never successfully commercialised it. Klatte is sometimes incorrectly attributed to be the discoverer or inventor of PVC. In 1912/13, together with the chemists Emil Zacharias and Adolf Rollett, he invented the production process for polyvinyl chloride (PVC)

== Notes ==
For further biographical information (including photo), see (in German): Erfinder(Inventor): Fritz Klatte, 1913 - PVC.
