= Stemweder Berg =

Mountains in Germany

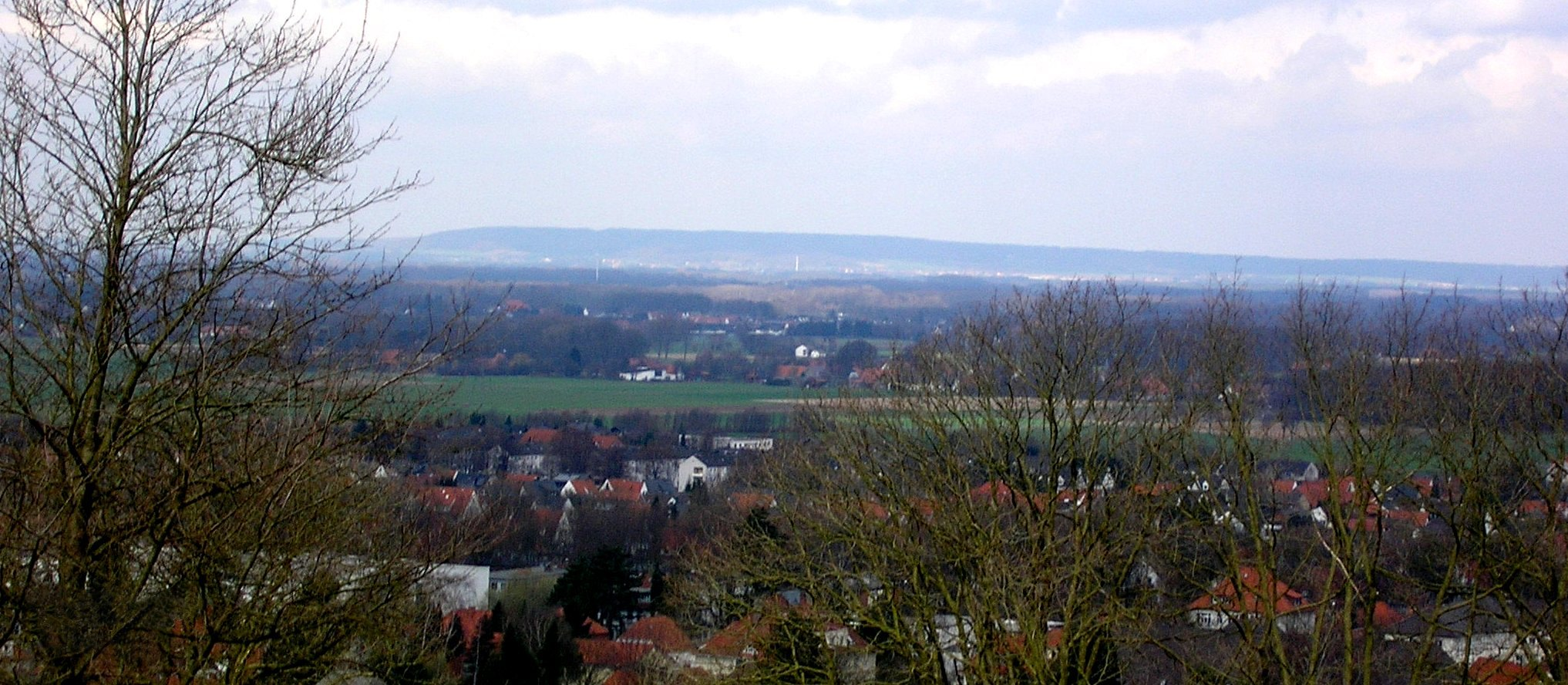

Highest point
- Peak: Kollwesshöh
- Elevation: 181.4 m above NN

Dimensions
- Length: 7 km (4.3 mi)

Geography
- Country: Germany
- States: Lower Saxony and North Rhine-Westphalia
- Range coordinates: 52°26′55″N 8°25′49″E

The Stemweder Berg (also known as the Stemmer Berge) is a ridge 181.4 metres (595 ft) above sea level on the border of North Rhine-Westphalia and Lower Saxony in Germany. It is the northernmost and smallest of Germany's Central Uplands ranges.

Like the adjacent municipality of Stemwede, the ridge gets its name from the medieval Free County (Freigrafschaft) of Stemwede.

== Location ==
The Stemweder Berg lies on the southern rim of the North German Plain.

== Relief ==
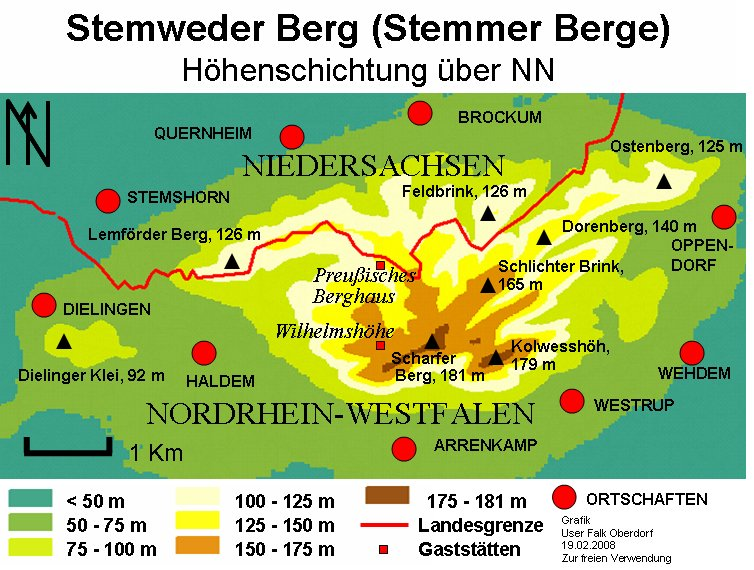
The section through the Stemwede Berg clearly shows it to be a hill ridge

Amongst the elevations on the Stemweder Berg are the following − sorted by height in metres above Normalnull (NN):
Abbreviations: Lower Saxony = LS, North Rhine-Westphalia = NRW

- Kollwesshöh (181.4 m), NRW
- Scharfer Berg (180.1 m), NRW
- Schlichter Brink (ca. 170 m), NRW
- Rauher Berg (167.8 m), NRW
- Wegmannsberg (160.5 m), NRW
- Kahler Hügel (146.4 m), NRW
- Junger Berg (ca. 145 m), NRW
- Dorenberg (140.3 m), NRW
- Feldbrink (128.1 m), LS
- Ostenberg (127.4 m), NRW
- Lemförder Berg (124.0 m), LS
- Brockumer Klei (116.5 m), LS
- Wehdemer Klei (98.1 m), NRW

The Dielinger Klei (91.7 m, NRW) may also be included as it is a dominant hill in the Stemwede area.

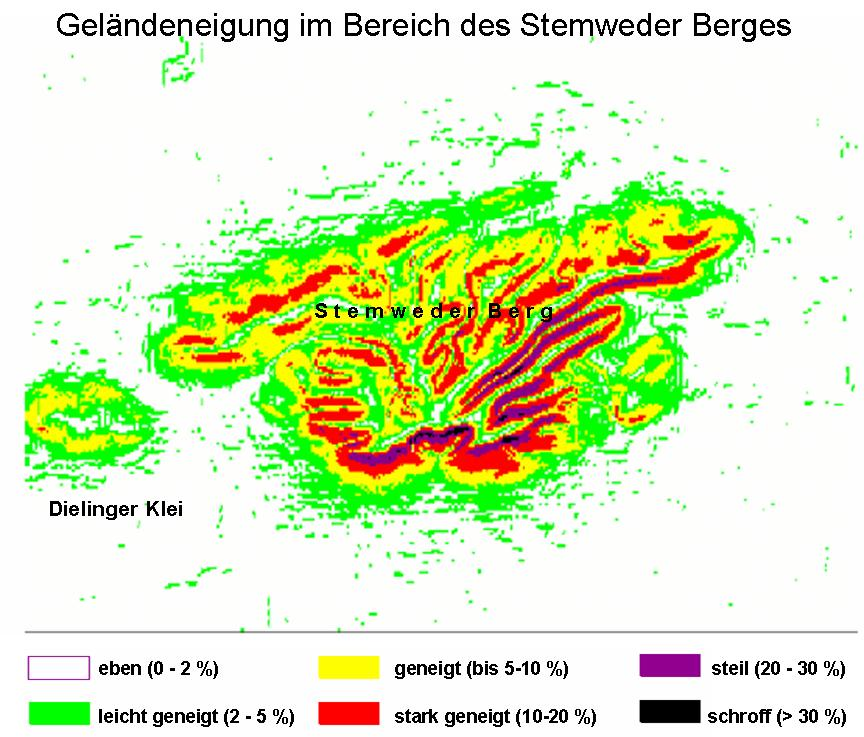
The Stemweder Berg has steep and rugged terrain especially in the south

== Streams ==
Amongst the streams near the Stemweder Berg are the:

- Großer Dieckfluss, a western tributary of the Große Aue, which passes the ridge to the south
- Hunte, a southwestern tributary of the Weser, which passes the ridge some way to the west
