= Steinfeld (Oldenburg) =

- Municipality
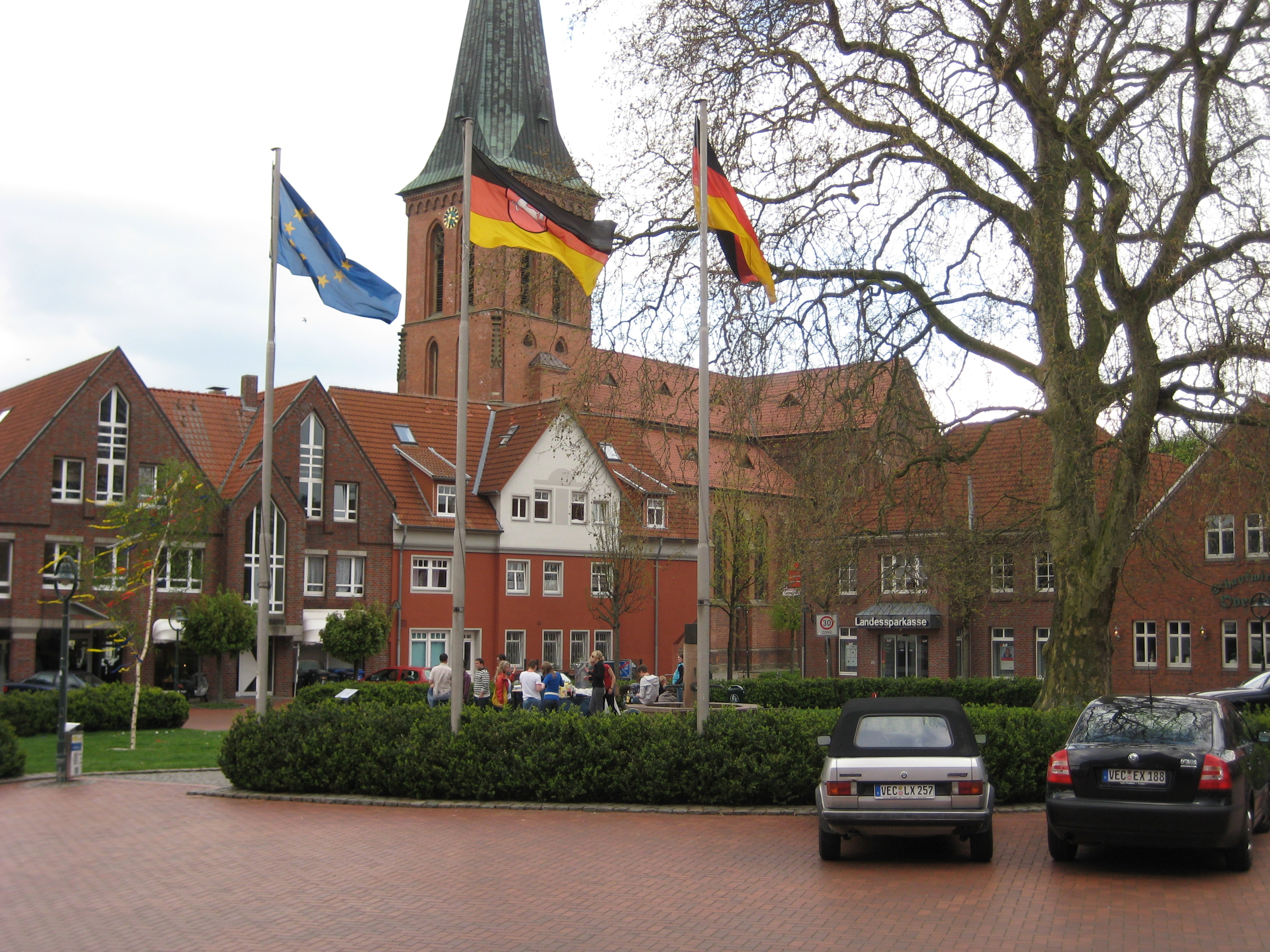
- Town centre

- Coat of arms

- Location of Steinfeld within Vechta district
- Interactive map of Steinfeld
- Location within Germany Location within Lower Saxony
- Coordinates: 52°36′N 8°13′E
- Country: Germany
- State: Lower Saxony
- District: Vechta
- Subdivisions: 10 districts

Government
  - Mayor: Max Bernd Trumme (GFG) (Ind.)

Area
  - Total: 60.05 km^{2} (23.19 sq mi)
- Elevation: 47 m (154 ft)

Population (2025-12-31)
  - Total: 10,425
  - Density: 173.6/km^{2} (449.6/sq mi)
- Time zone: UTC+01:00 (CET)
  - Summer (DST): UTC+02:00 (CEST)
- Postal codes: 49439
- Dialling codes: 05492
- Vehicle registration: VEC
- Website: www.steinfeld.de

Steinfeld (German pronunciation: [ˈʃtaɪnˌfɛlt]) is a municipality in the district of Vechta, in Lower Saxony, Germany. It is situated approximately 16 km southwest of Vechta, and 40 km northeast of Osnabrück.

== People ==
- Theo Schönhöft (1932–1976), German footballer
- Paul Schockemöhle (born 1945), German horse show jumper
- Andreas Bergmann (born 1959), German football coach and player
- Jürgen Krogmann (born 1963), German politician (SPD)
