= Damme (Dümmer) =

- Town
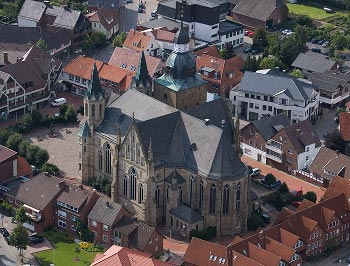

- Flag Coat of arms

- Location of Damme within Vechta district
- Interactive map of Damme
- Location within Germany Location within Lower Saxony
- Coordinates: 52°31′15″N 8°11′55″E
- Country: Germany
- State: Lower Saxony
- District: Vechta
- Subdivisions: 30 districts

Government
  - Mayor (2021–26): Mike Otte (CDU)

Area
  - Total: 104.39 km^{2} (40.31 sq mi)
- Elevation: 53 m (174 ft)

Population (2025-12-31)
  - Total: 17,449
  - Density: 167.15/km^{2} (432.92/sq mi)
- Time zone: UTC+01:00 (CET)
  - Summer (DST): UTC+02:00 (CEST)
- Postal codes: 49401
- Dialling codes: 0 54 91
- Vehicle registration: VEC
- Website: www.damme.de

Damme (German pronunciation: [ˈdamə]) is a town in the district of Vechta, in Lower Saxony, Germany. It is situated right next to lake Dümmer, approximately 25 km south of Vechta, and 36 km northeast of Osnabrück.

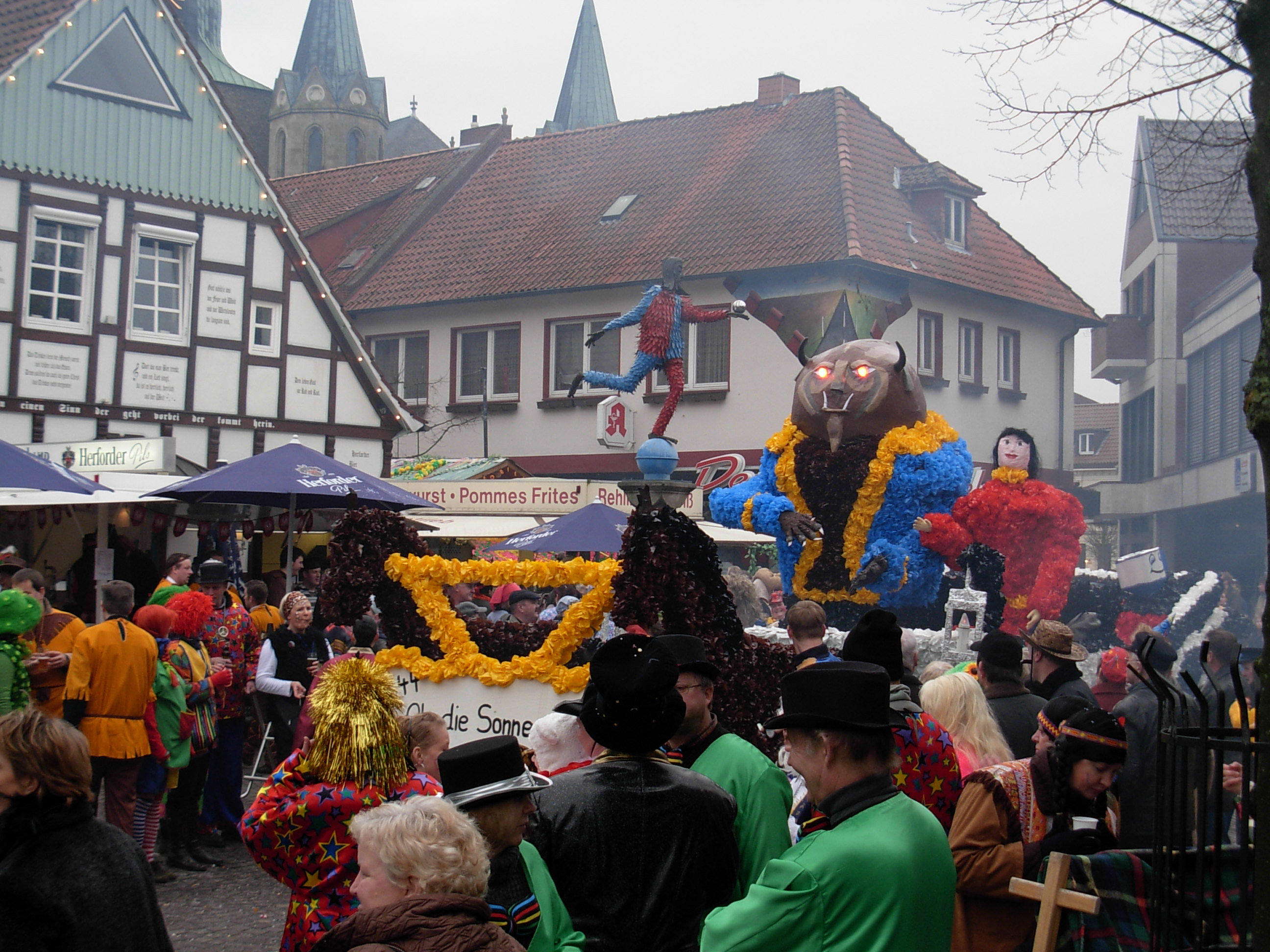
Carnival Damme 2008

== Sons and daughters of the town ==
- John Stallo (1823-1900), German-American-academic, jurist, philosopher and ambassador
- Heinrich Enneking (1855-1947), German politician (center), a member of the Oldenburg Landtag
- Franz Meyer (1882-1945), German politician (center), 1920-1933 member of the Oldenburg Landtag
- Johannes Pohlschneider (1899-1981), 1954-1974 bishop of Aachen
- Theodor Hillenhinrichs (1901-1990), German politician and Member of Landtag (CDU)
- Anton Cromme (1901-1953), chemist and member of parliament (CDU)
- Wolfgang Knabe (born 1959), triple jumper
