= Diepholz =

- Town
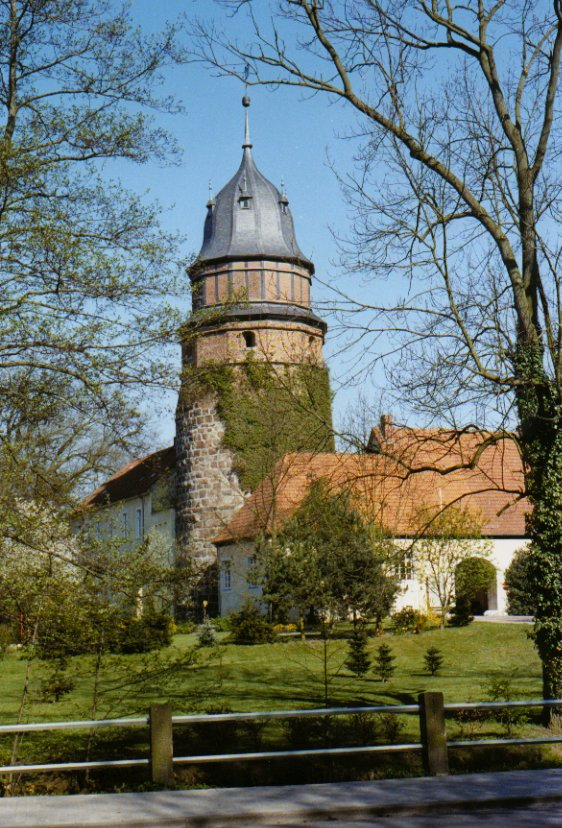

- Flag Coat of arms

- Location of Diepholz within Diepholz district
- Interactive map of Diepholz
- Location within Germany Location within Lower Saxony
- Coordinates: 52°36′26″N 8°22′16″E
- Country: Germany
- State: Lower Saxony
- District: Diepholz

Government
  - Mayor: Florian Marré

Area
  - Total: 104.45 km^{2} (40.33 sq mi)
- Elevation: 37 m (121 ft)

Population (2025-12-31)
  - Total: 17,677
  - Density: 169.24/km^{2} (438.33/sq mi)
- Time zone: UTC+01:00 (CET)
  - Summer (DST): UTC+02:00 (CEST)
- Postal codes: 49356
- Dialling codes: 0 54 41
- Vehicle registration: DH, SY
- Website: www.stadt-diepholz.de

Diepholz (German pronunciation: [ˈdiːpˌhɔlts]; Northern Low Saxon: Deefholt) is a town and capital of the district of Diepholz in Lower Saxony, Germany. It is situated on the rivers Hunte and Lohne, approximately 45 km northeast of Osnabrück, and 60 km southwest of Bremen.

It was the capital of the sovereign County of Diepholz and the principal seat of the Noble Lords, later Counts, of Diepholz.

== Administrative division ==
Diepholz consists of the core city of Diepholz (44.59 km²), which comprises several boroughs, as well as the incorporated villages of Aschen (32.01 km²), Sankt Hülfe (15.75 km²) and Heede (12.12 km²).

Aschen is located 4 km north of the core town of Diepholz between the Federal Roads B 69 and the B 51. There is the local museum of Aschen, where large and small agricultural equipment, household items and workshops are displayed.

== Politics ==
=== City Council ===
The City Council of Diepholz consists of 32 councilwomen and councilmen. This is the prescribed number for a municipality with a population between 15,001 and 20,000 inhabitants. Council members are elected for five-year terms through a local election. In addition to the 32 members elected in the municipal council election, the full-time mayor also has voting rights in the council.

The results of the 2021 local election led to the following seat distribution:

- CDU: 12 seats
- SPD: 9 seats
- FDP: 4 seats
- GREENS: 4 seats
- LEFT: 1 seat
- AfD: 2 seats

=== Mayor ===
On 10 June 2018 Florian Marré (independent), supported by the CDU and FDP, was elected as the Mayor in a runoff election with 50.65% of the votes, succeeding Thomas Schulze.

== Religion ==
According to the census conducted in 2011, 59.1% of the city's inhabitants were Evangelical Christians, 13.3% were Roman Catholic, and 27.6% were irreligious, belonged to a different religious community or preferred not to say. On 31 December 2019, of 17.577 inhabitants, 47.3% were Evangelical Christians, 18.9% Roman Catholic and 33.8% of other confessions, or irreligious.

== Notable people ==
Notable people associated with Diepholz include:

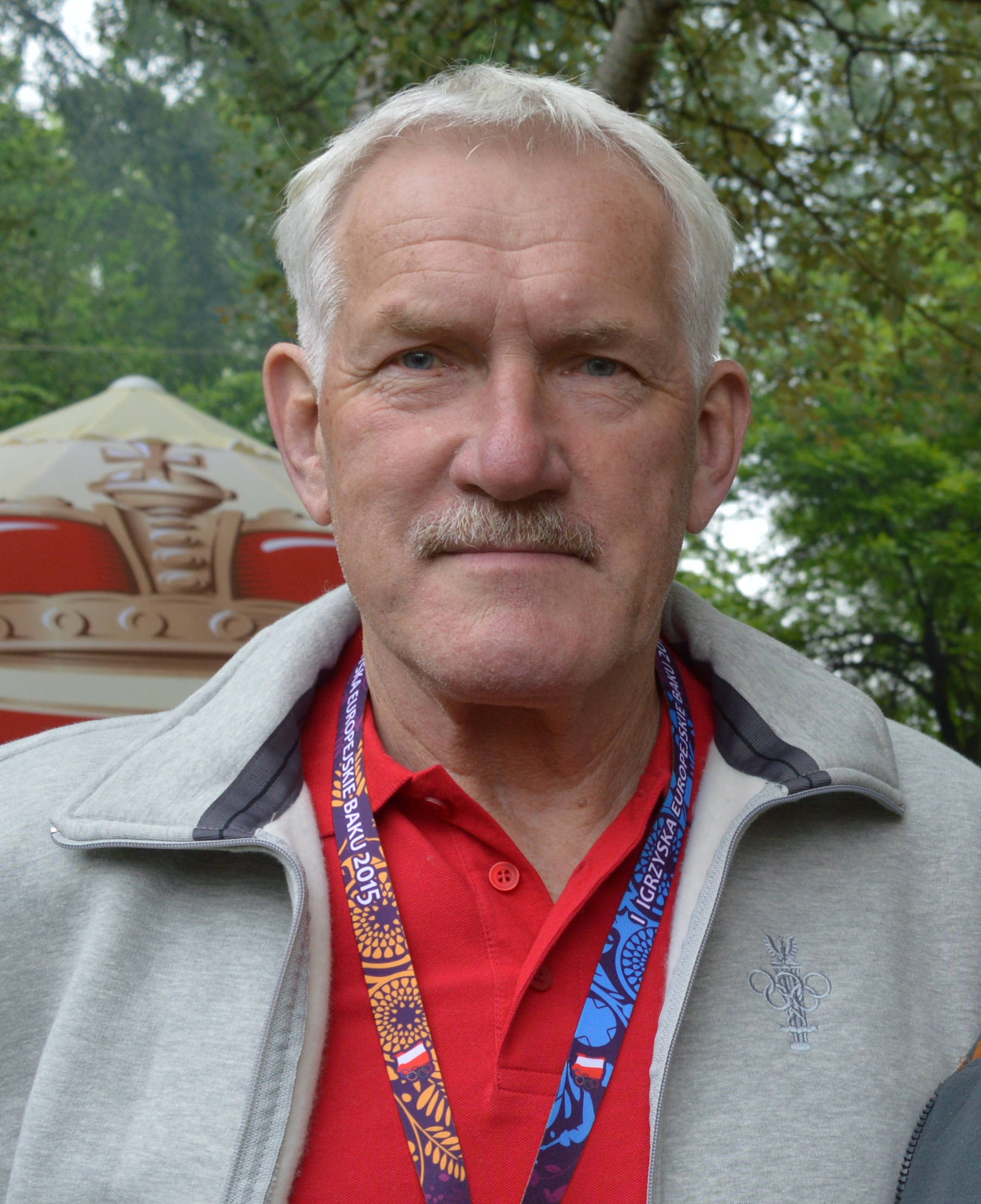
Zygfryd Kuchta, 2015

- Marianne of Sweden (died after 1285), Swedish Princess and countess consort of Diepholz
- Rudolf van Diepholt (c. 1390 – 1455), bishop of Utrecht and bishop of Osnabrück
- Georg Moller (1784–1852), architect and town planner who worked in the South of Germany, mostly in Hesse.
- Fritz Klatte (1880–1934), German chemist, discovered polyvinyl acetate
- Eva Leo (1901–1998 in Dubuque, Iowa), German Master Metal Sculptor
- Zygfryd Kuchta (born 1944), Polish handball player, team bronze medallist at the 1976 Summer Olympics
- Klaus Schlichte (born 1963), political scientist and professor

== Climate ==
Climate data for Diepholz (1991–2020 normals)
Month	Jan	Feb	Mar	Apr	May	Jun	Jul	Aug	Sep	Oct	Nov	Dec	Year
Mean daily maximum °C (°F)	4.6 (40.3)	5.7 (42.3)	9.5 (49.1)	14.5 (58.1)	18.5 (65.3)	21.4 (70.5)	23.7 (74.7)	23.4 (74.1)	19.3 (66.7)	14.1 (57.4)	8.6 (47.5)	5.4 (41.7)	14.1 (57.4)
Daily mean °C (°F)	2.2 (36.0)	2.7 (36.9)	5.4 (41.7)	9.5 (49.1)	13.4 (56.1)	16.4 (61.5)	18.5 (65.3)	18.0 (64.4)	14.2 (57.6)	9.9 (49.8)	5.8 (42.4)	3.1 (37.6)	9.9 (49.8)
Mean daily minimum °C (°F)	−0.6 (30.9)	−0.4 (31.3)	1.4 (34.5)	4.1 (39.4)	7.7 (45.9)	10.8 (51.4)	12.9 (55.2)	12.4 (54.3)	9.2 (48.6)	5.9 (42.6)	2.7 (36.9)	0.4 (32.7)	5.5 (41.9)
Average precipitation mm (inches)	59.9 (2.36)	48.4 (1.91)	47.5 (1.87)	38.4 (1.51)	49.3 (1.94)	63.1 (2.48)	68.7 (2.70)	74.0 (2.91)	60.2 (2.37)	59.7 (2.35)	55.8 (2.20)	65.5 (2.58)	686.7 (27.04)
Average precipitation days (≥ 0.1 mm)	18.3	16.4	15.6	13.2	13.6	14.2	15.1	15.3	14.0	16.5	18.0	19.2	188.7
Average snowy days (≥ 1.0 cm)	4.9	4.0	1.1	0	0	0	0	0	0	0	0.8	3.2	15.7
Average relative humidity (%)	88.1	84.6	79.4	72.1	71.1	72.1	72.8	74.9	80.8	85.3	89.2	89.5	79.9
Mean monthly sunshine hours	45.9	71.4	118.5	179.1	204.9	201.9	210.9	197.8	149.7	109.2	52.8	40.9	1,577.1
Source: NOAA

== See also ==
- Lordship, later County, of Diepholz
