= Hunte =

River in Germany

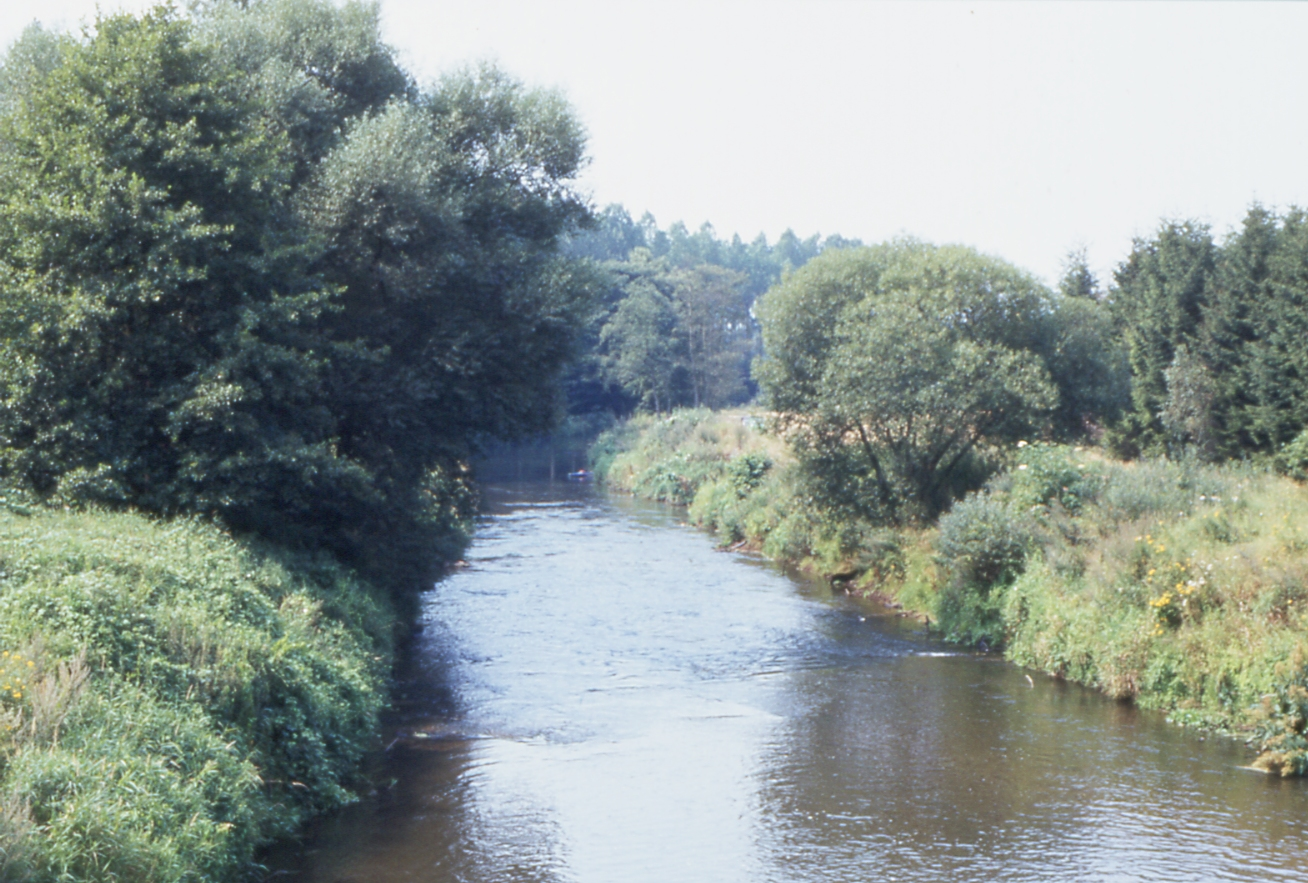
- The Hunte in the Wildeshausen Geest

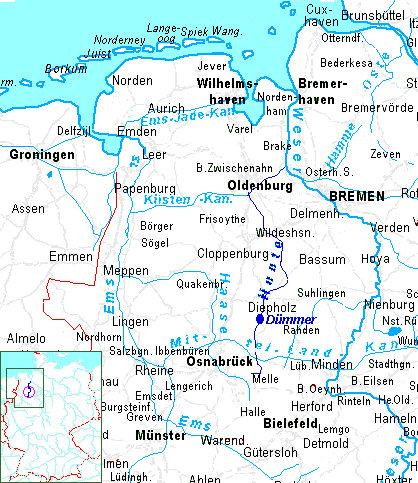

Location
- Country: Germany
- State: Lower Saxony

Physical characteristics
- Source
  - location: Wiehengebirge
  - coordinates: 52°15′36″N 8°20′33″E
  - elevation: 185 m above sea level (NN)
- Mouth
  - location: Elsfleth
  - coordinates: 53°15′10″N 8°28′44″E
  - elevation: 0 m (0 ft)
- Length: 189 km (117 mi)
- Basin size: 2,635 km^{2} (1,017 mi^{2})

Basin features
- Progression: Weser→ North Sea
- Landmarks: Cities: Oldenburg; Large towns: Melle; Small towns: Diepholz, Wildeshausen, Elsfleth
- Population: 432000
- Tributaries
  - left: Haaren, Lethe
  - right: Wagenfelder Aue, Ollen
- Waterbodies: Lakes: Dümmer
- Navigable: between Oldenburg and Elsfleth for Europa Ships and coasters; as far as the Coastal Canal (Küstenkanal) for ships up to 1000 Brutto Register Tonnage

Hunte (German pronunciation: [ˈhʊntə]) is a 189-kilometre (117 mi) long river in north-western Germany (Lower Saxony), a left tributary of the Weser.

The Hunte rises in the Wiehen Hills. In the North German Plain it flows through lake Dümmer. It flows generally northwards through the towns Bad Essen, Diepholz, Wildeshausen and Oldenburg. It flows into the Weser in Elsfleth. The part between Oldenburg and the Weser is navigable for coastal cargo ships. The Küsten Canal, suitable for inland navigation only, links the Hunte in Oldenburg to river Ems near Papenburg.

== Catchment ==
The catchment of the Hunte is relatively narrow (its maximum width is about 40 km (25 mi)) and it extends from south to north mainly within the state of Lower Saxony but also to a small extent in North Rhine-Westphalia (counties of Minden-Lübbecke and Herford) for a length of about 110 km (68 mi). The highest point of the catchment area is the Nonnenstein in the Wiehen Hills (275 m above NN), the lowest regions of the catchment lie within the marshes on the lower Hunte (partly below sea level). By far the largest part of the catchment lies on the North German Plain, so that the Hunte flows mainly through bogs, geest and marshland. A small portion lies within the Central Uplands.

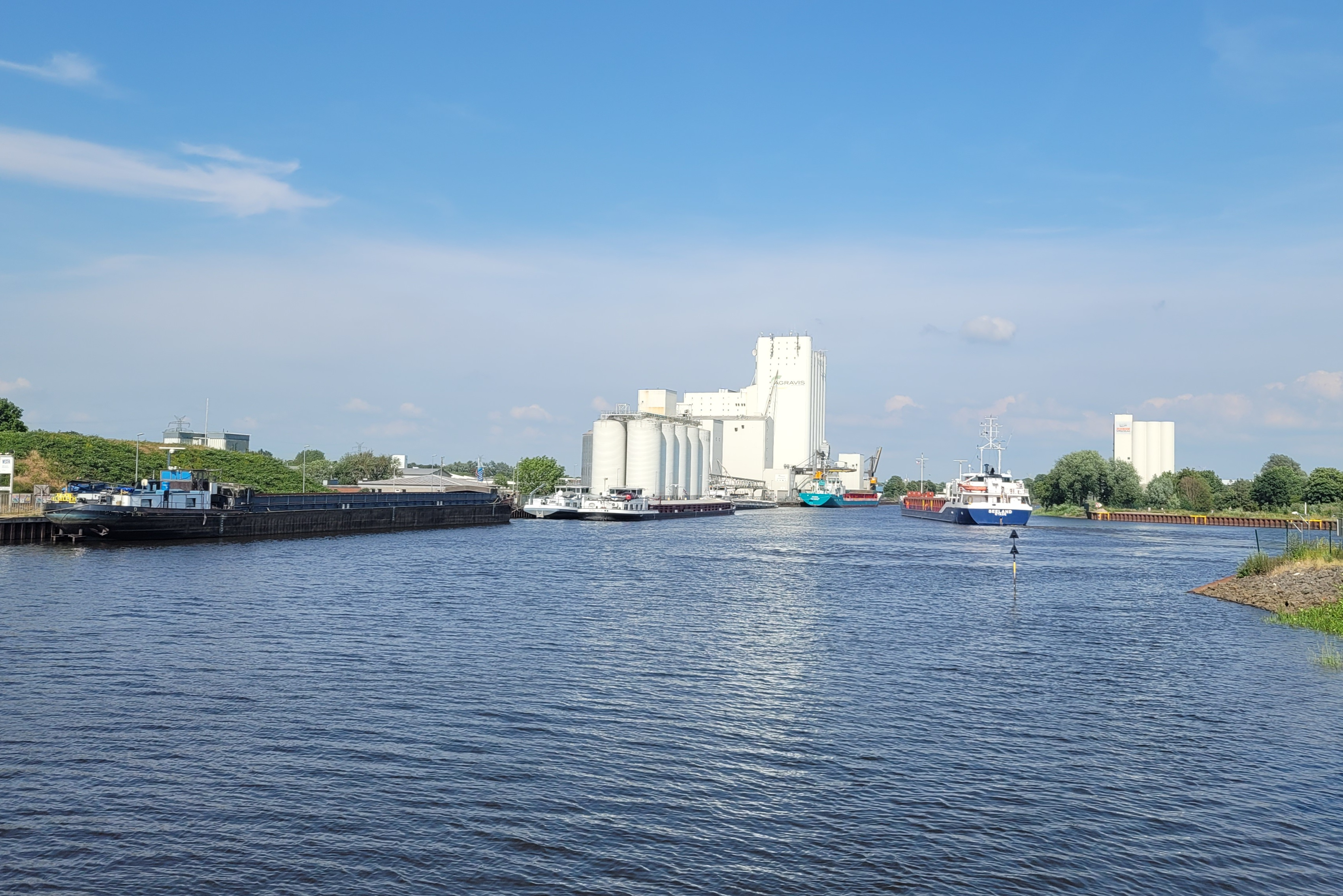
The Hunte in Oldenburg

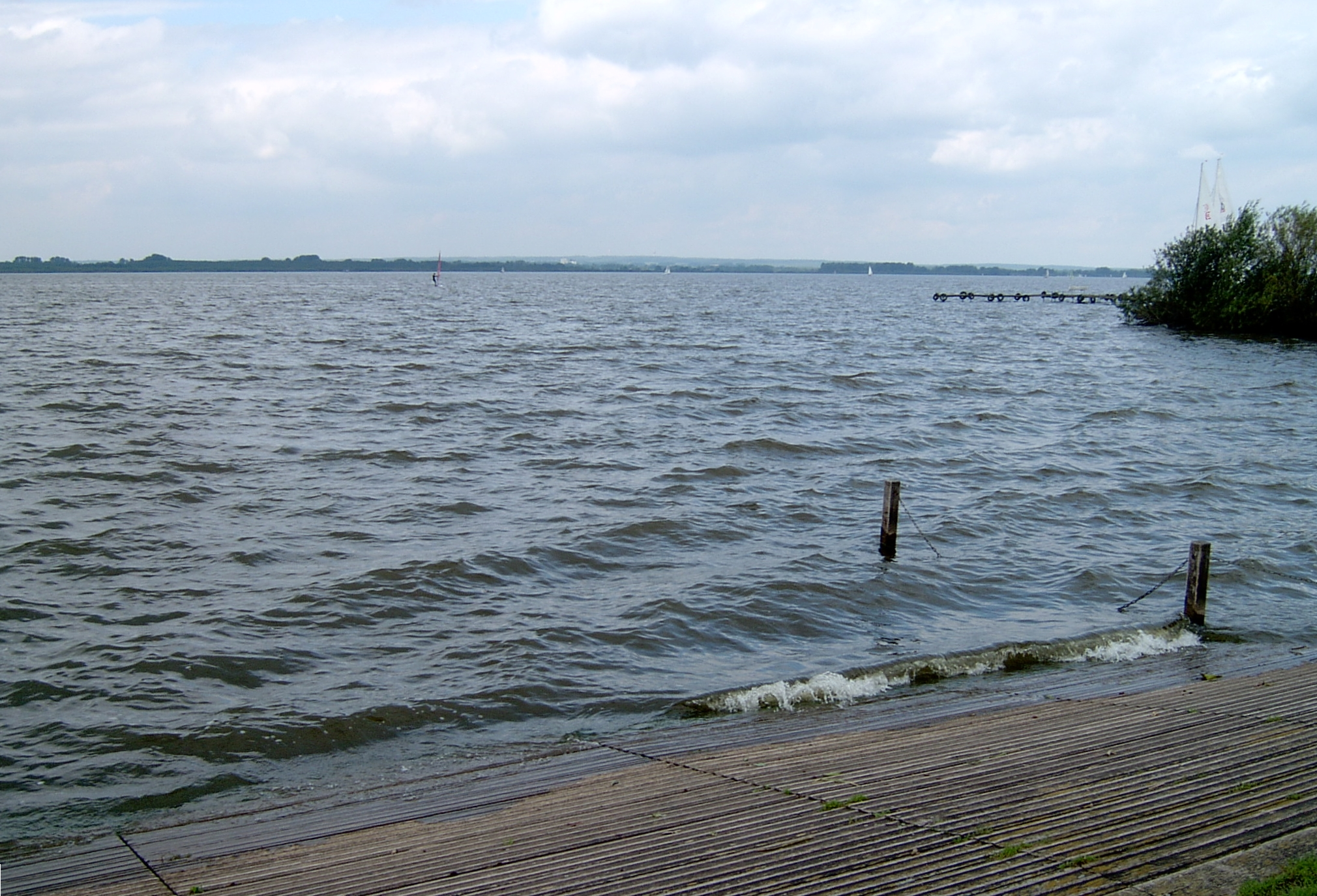
Lake Dümmer

== See also ==
- List of rivers of Lower Saxony
