= Ankum Heights =

Hill range in Germany

The Ankum Heights (German: Ankumer Höhe), also called the Fürstenau Hills (Fürstenauer Berge), are a ridge of hills up to 140 m high in the western part of the state of Lower Saxony on the North German Plain.

== Geography ==
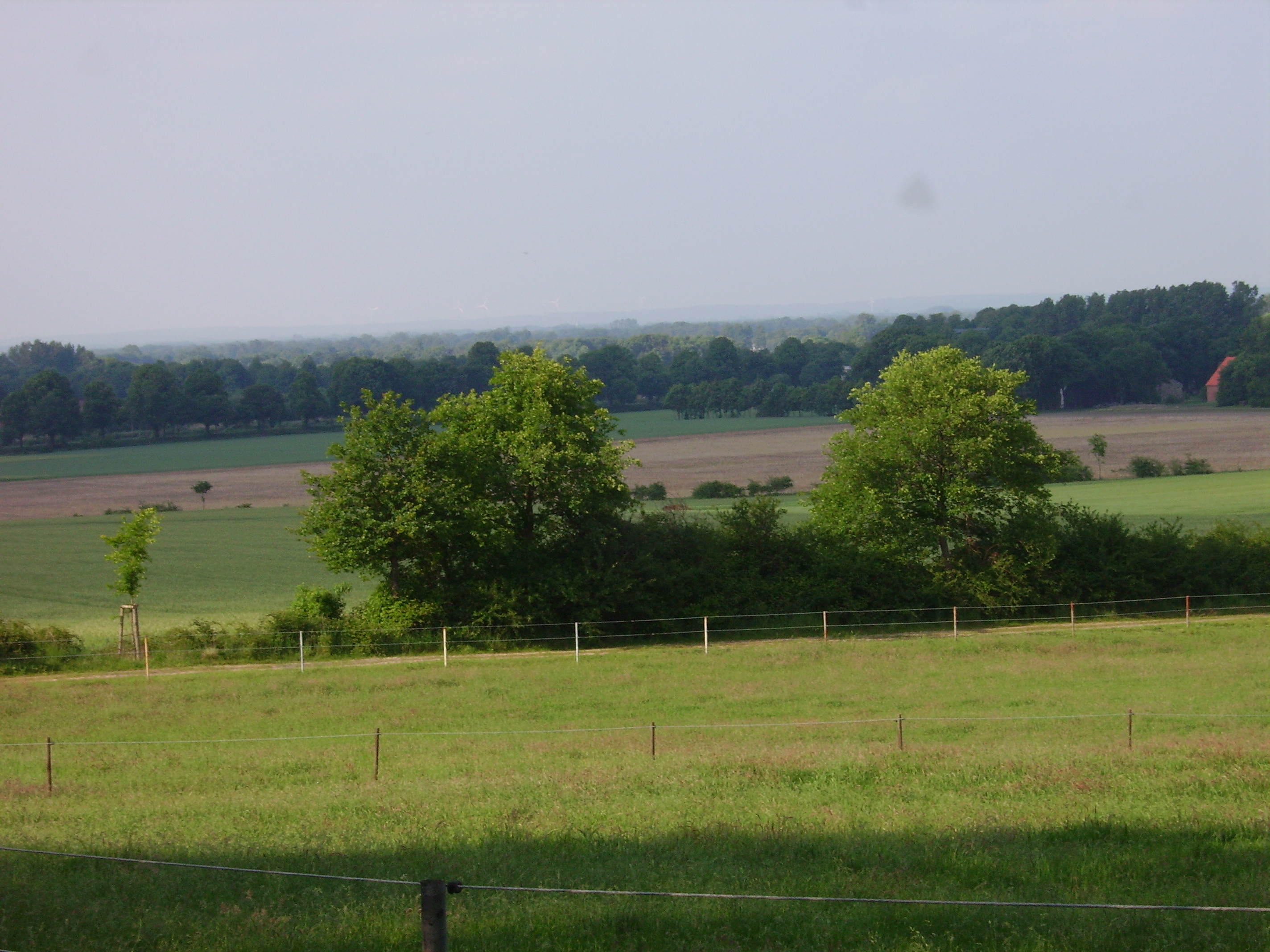
From the slope of the Kälberberg near Obersteinbeck the silhouette of the Ankum Heights can be made out on the horizon

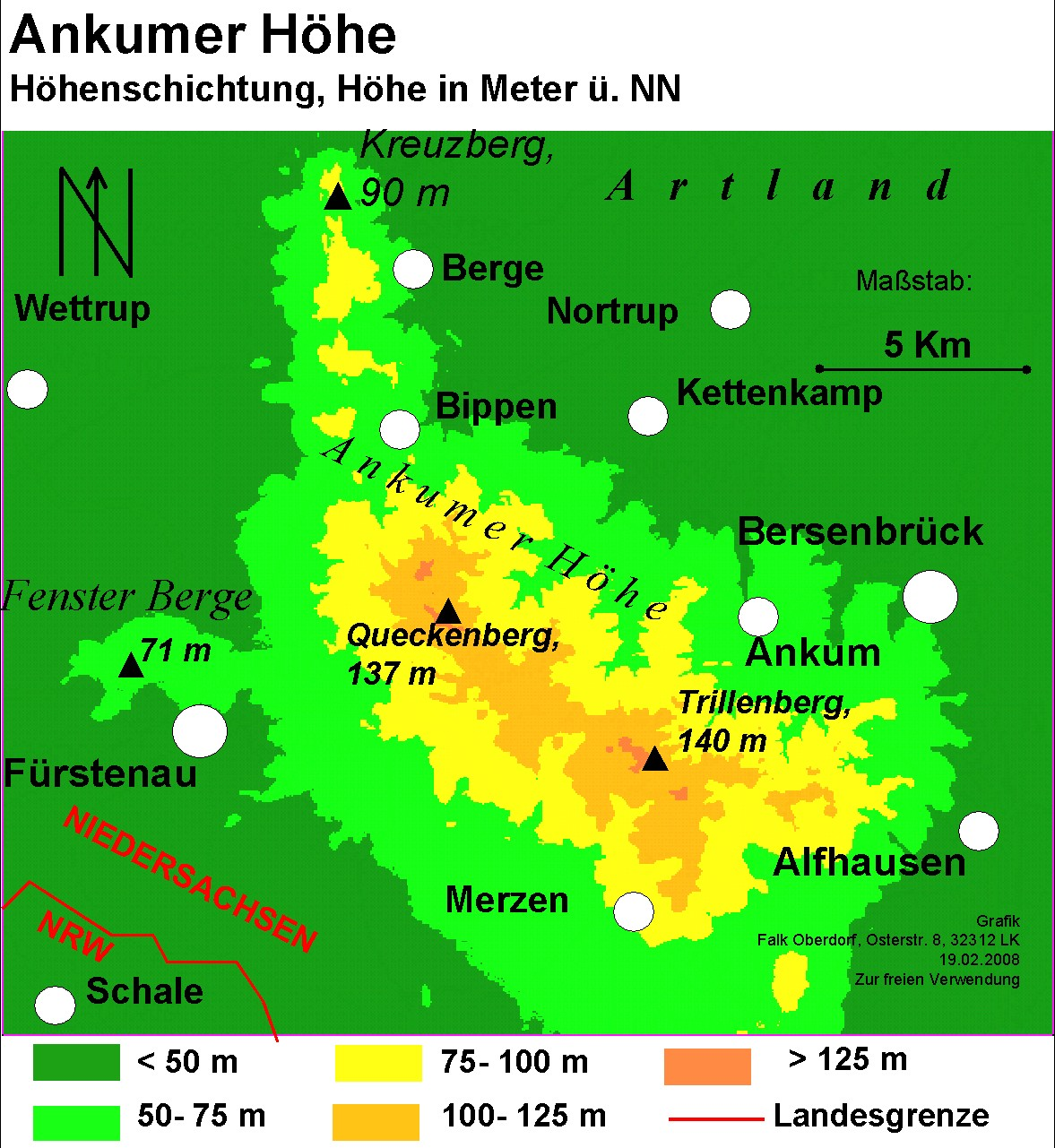
Relief map of the Ankum Heights

The densely forested Ankum Heights, which are about 20 kilometres (12 mi) long and only a few kilometres wide, lies roughly 34 kilometres (21 mi) north-northwest of the city of Osnabrück on the boundary of the districts of Emsland and Osnabrück between Herzlake to the northwest and Bramsche to the southeast, Fürstenau in the southwest and Bersenbrück in the northeast. The southeastern foothills of the ridge, which form the northwestern part of the North Teutoburg Forest-Wiehen Hills Nature Park reach almost as far as the Alfsee lake.

East of the Ankum Heights are the Damme Hills, to the southeast are the west-northwestern outliers of the Wiehen Hills, to the south is Tecklenburg Land and the northwestern outliers of the Teutoburg Forest, to the west the Lingen Heights and the Emsland, in the northwest the Hümmling and to the north the Oldenburg Münsterland.

== Geology ==
The Ankum Heights are part of a series of ice age end moraines from the early part of the Saale glaciation, the so-called Drenthe I stage. The Lingen Heights, the Damme Hills, the Kellenberg and the Brelinger Berg also belong to this push moraine, also called the Rehburg Phase, which can be dated to about 230,000 years ago. The Rehburg Hills by the lake of the Steinhuder Meer, are not, however, part of the moraine.

Together with their almost symmetrical counterpart, the Damme Hills, the Ankum Heights display the most marked glacial lobes of this push moraine. It filled the lowland bay of the Artland.

== History ==
Several tumuli indicate that the Ankum Heights were already occupied in prehistoric times.

== Transport links ==
The Ankum Heights may be reached from the B 68 federal road, which passes the ridge to the east, the B 218, which runs along the southwestern edge of the feature, the 214, which crosses it from west to east, and the B 402, which runs west of the Ankum Heights. A number of local Landesstraßen and Kreisstraßen roads branch off the B roads and lead to the ridge.

== Hills ==
The highest elevations in the Ankum Heights are the Trillenberg, which is 140 metres (460 ft) high and is located in the southeastern part, and the Queckenberg, which has a 140 metres (460 ft) northwestern summit and a 137 metres (449 ft) southeastern peak and lies in the centre of the range.

- Trillenberg (140 m above sea level (NN) )
- Queckenberg (140 bzw. 137 m)
- Schillerberg (133 m)
- Krippenfeldberg (125 m)
- Schnaatberg (approximately 125 m)
- Beester Berg (124 m)
- Kolkenberg (120 m)
- Kuhberg (120 m)
- Weserberg (approximately 120 m)
- Hamberg (119 m)
- Steinberg (119 m)
- Boberg (117 m)
- Pennigsberg (113 m)
- Lehmberg (108 m)
- Rocksberg (108 m)
- Heiligenberg (104 m)
- Hohes Haus (100 m)
- Schillerberg (100 m)
- Kreuzberg (90 m)
- Buddenberg (75 m)

== Waterbodies ==
The rivers and streams in and near the Ankum Heights include the:

- Hase, passing the Ankum Heights to the east; an eastern tributary of the Ems
- Fürstenauer Mühlenbach, rises in the middle of the Heights; an eastern tributary of the Deeper Aa in the catchment area of the Großer Aa
- Ueffelner Aue, rises in the southeast of the Heights; southwestern tributary of the Hase
- Weeser Aa, rises in the southeast, upper course of the Halverder Aa in the catchment area of the Großer Aa

== Villages ==
In the Ankum Heights and in the northwestern part of the North Teutoburg Forest-Wiehen Hills Nature Park are the following villages:
(in alphabetical order)

- Alfhausen
- Ankum
- Berge
- Bippen
- Eggermühlen
- Kettenkamp
- Merzen

Near the Ankum Heights and the northwestern part of the surrounding nature park are the following villages:
(in alphabetical order)

- Bersenbrück
- Bramsche
- Fürstenau
- Herzlake
- Neuenkirchen (part of Neuenkirchen (Samtgemeinde))
- Neuenkirchen (borough of Neuenkirchen-Vörden)
- Nortrup
- Rieste
- Ueffeln
