= Bundesstraße 214 =

Federal highway in Germany

B 214
- Bundesstraße 214
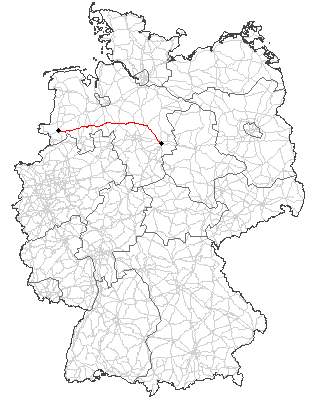

Route information
- Length: 250 km (160 mi)

Major junctions
- West end: Lingen
- B 70 B 213
- East end: Brunswick

Location
- Country: Germany
- States: Lower Saxony

Highway system
- Roads in Germany; Autobahns; List; Federal; List; State; E-roads

The Bundesstraße 214 (B 214) is a federal road that runs from Lingen to Brunswick in northern Germany.

== Route ==
The B 214 begins on the Lingen Heights, the highest elevation in the Emsland, where it branches off the B 70 and B 213, and runs eastwards in the north of Osnabrück district, where it crosses the Ankum Heights in the North Teutoburg Forest-Wiehengebirge Nature Park. It crosses the A 1 autobahn at the Holdorf exit. The B 214 then continues, crossing the Damme Hills and runs north of the Dümmer lake through numerous boggy (moor) areas. In Nienburg it crosses the River Weser. East of the Leine river B 214 runs parallel to the Aller through the southern part of the Lüneburg Heath. It crosses the A 7 motorway at the Schwarmstedt exit. Behind Celle it changes direction to the southeast and continues on west of the river Oker. In Ohof near Meinersen it runs over the Hanover–Berlin high-speed railway, where there was a level crossing until 1997. Beyond the Wendeburg village of Neubrück it crosses the A 2 motorway and then the Mittelland Canal. Passing through Watenbüttel it finally arrives at Brunswick. It ends there today at Amalienplatz on the central ring road in the town and merges into the B 1.

=== Districts, towns and villages ===
- Lower Saxony
  - Emsland district
    - Lingen (Ems), Thuine, Freren, Andervenne
  - Osnabrück district
    - Fürstenau, Ankum, Bersenbrück, Gehrde, Badbergen
  - Vechta district
    - Holdorf, Steinfeld (Oldenburg)
  - Diepholz district
    - Diepholz, Wetschen, Rehden, Hemsloh, Barver, Wehrbleck, Sulingen (ring road), Maasen, Borstel
  - Landkreis Nienburg/Weser
    - Wietzen, Marklohe, Nienburg/Weser (Ortsumgehung), Steimbke, Rodewald
  - Soltau-Fallingbostel district
    - Gilten, Schwarmstedt, Essel, Buchholz (Aller)
  - Celle district
    - Wietze, Hambühren, Celle, Wienhausen, Eicklingen, Bröckel (ring road)
  - Hanover Region
    - Uetze (Village in Kreuzkrug, part of Eltze)
  - Gifhorn district
    - Meinersen (village in Ohof)
  - Peine district
    - Edemissen, Wendeburg (part of Neubrück)
  - Gifhorn district
    - Schwülper
  - Brunswick

=== Rivers crossed ===
- Hase, in Bersenbrück
- Hunte, in Diepholz
- Wagenfelder Aue, in Barver
- Weser, in Nienburg
- Leine, in Schwarmstedt
- Wietze, in Wietze
- Fuhse, in Celle shortly before its confluence with the Aller
- Mittelland Canal, in Brunswick north of Watenbüttel

== History ==
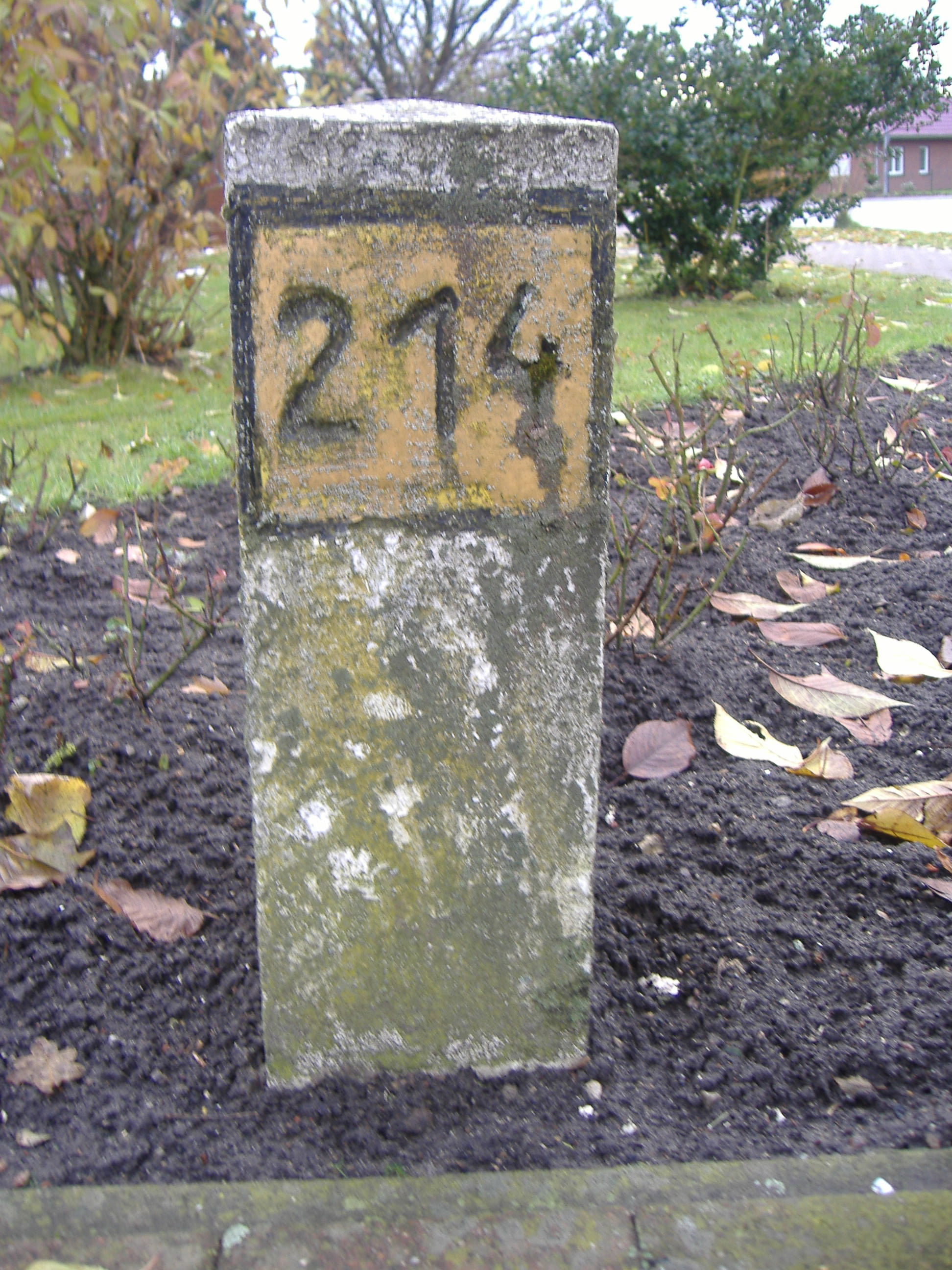
Old kilometre stone by the old B 214 through road in Sulingen.

=== Origin ===
The metalled, man-made road (Chaussee) between Brunswick and Celle was built from 1804 to 1815 and called Celler Straße.

The westernmost section between Lingen, Fürstenau and Bersenbrück was opened to traffic on 1 July 1856. A regular post coach ran on this road from that day until the opening of the Rheine–Quakenbrück railway on 1 July 1879. From 1925 the section between Freren and Lingen was served by a bus line.

=== Former routing and names ===
Between 1934 and 1938 the road was called the Reichsstraße 214.

The B 214 used to run within Brunswick past its present end at Amalienplatz down Celler Straße and the western arm of the Oker and the Radeklint to the city centre.

Since the Reichsstraße times many of the B 214's former routes through villages and towns have been replaced by ring road section, the last (in 2008) being the bypass around Diepholz. Since the B 214 now crosses the Weser at Nienburg together with the B 6, there is no longer the risk of it being closed due to flooding.

=== Replacements ===
The section between Brunswick and Watenbüttel and the so-called northern ring road in Brunswick around the formerly separate village of Ölper was replaced in the 1980s by the roughly 4 km long A 392 motorway (so-called Nordtangente Braunschweig), which then runs on eastwards to the exit at Hamburger Straße.

The very short A 392 even has a motorway intersection, the Ölper Knoten with the A 391.

=== Cancelled plans ===
The route from Nienburg as far as the crossing with the B 3 near Celle was originally to have been upgraded to form part of the scrapped A 32 autobahn project.

== Tourism ==
=== Holiday routes ===
The German Timber-Frame Road runs along the B 214 between Celle and Brunswick.

=== Places of interest ===
- Castle and historic old town (Altstadt) at Fürstenau
- St. Nicholas' Church (St.Nikolaus-Kirche or Artländer Dom) in Ankum
- Wienhausen Abbey
- Abbay Franziskanerinnen vom hl. Martyrer Georg Thuine
- Megalith-Stones Ankum, Freren and Thuine

== Junction lists ==
Legend:

- I/C - Interchange, I/S - Intersection, RSA - Rest and service area, OBR - Overhead bridge restaurant, R/R - Restaurant and rest plaza, L/B - Layby, V/P - Vista point, TN - tunnel, T/P - Toll plaza, BR - Bridge
- C - Cloverleaf, S - Stack, T-A - Trumpet-A, T-B - Trumpet-B, DT - Directional-T/Y, SDT - Semi-Directional-T/Y, P-Y - Partial-Y, D - Diamond, P-C - Partial cloverleaf, D-D - Diverging diamond, D-R - Direct ramp

km	Exit	Name	Destinations	Notes
		Lingen (Ems)	B 70 B 213	
		Thuine		
		Freren		
		Fürstenau	B 402	
		Schwagstorf	B 218	
		Ankum		
		Bersenbrück	B 68	
		Gehrde		
	66	Holdorf	A 1	
		Holdorf		
		Steinfeld (Oldb)		
		Diepholz	B 51	
		Rehden	B 239	
		Sulingen	B 61	
		Borstel		
		Nienburg	B 6 B 209 B 215	
		Steimbke		
		Schwarmstedt		
	50	Schwarmstedt	A 7	
		Wietze		
		Hambühren		
		Celle	B 3 B 191 B 244	
		Eicklingen		
		Uetze	B 188 B 444	
		Schwülper		
	53	Braunschweig-Watenbüttel	A 2	
		Braunschweig-Watenbüttel	A 392	

== See also ==
- List of federal roads in Germany
