= Artland (region) =

Region in Osnabrück, Lower Saxony

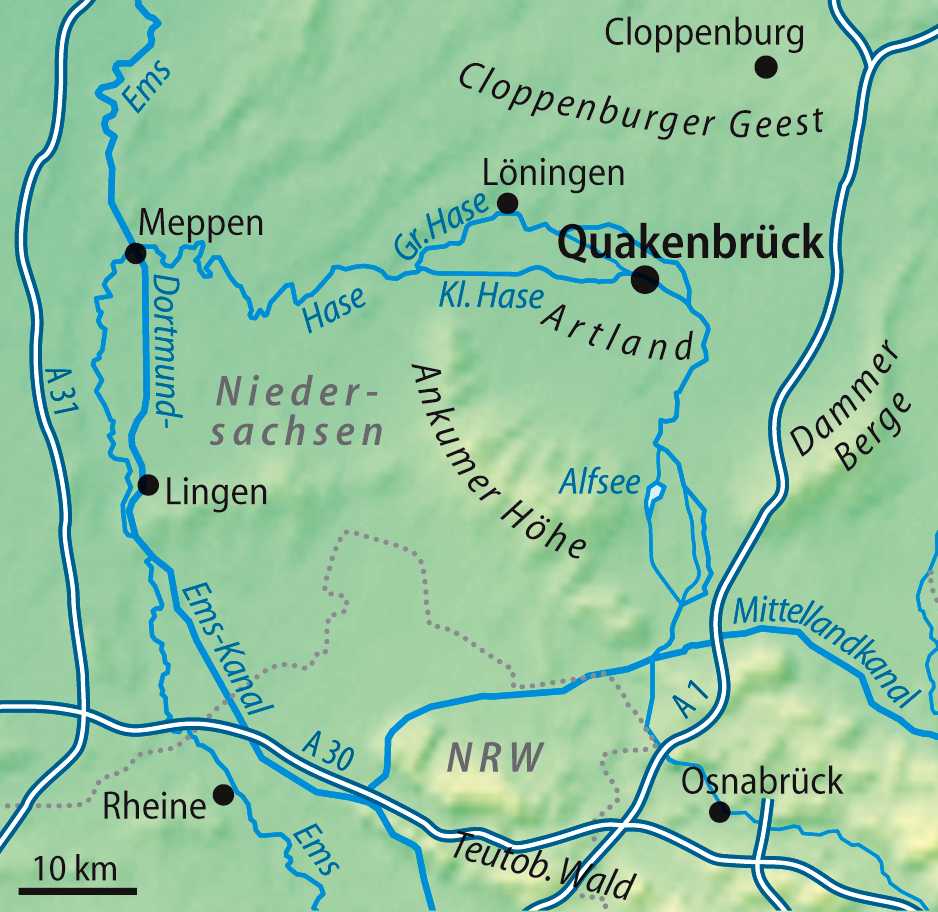
The location of the historic landscape of Artland in Osnabrück Land

The Artland lies in the North German district of Osnabrück in the state of Lower Saxony and covers an area of around 180 km^{2} that, today, includes the collective municipality of Artland (which in turn consist of the municipalities of Quakenbrück, Badbergen, Menslage and Nortrup) as well as the municipality of Gehrde. When one refers to the Artland as a single landscape unit, it lies within an arc of ice age end moraine that today forms the Damme and Bippen Hills.

The Artland was never a political unit; its church parishes did not belong to the same Ämter in the Bishopric of Osnabrück. Rather it was economic, cultural and family ties that made the Artland a single entity. In the sparsely populated region today, between the meadows, fields and hedge-covered embankments (Wallhecken) typical of North German geestland, bushes and copses, there are more than 700, often protected, isolated, timber-framed farms.

The designation Artland for this countryside was first used in the year 1309.

== History ==
After the end of the ice age the region of the present Artland became a vast glacial meltwater basin that was filled with alluvial sand by the local river, the Hase and its predecessor. This produced a rich farmland that has dominated the countryside for centuries up to the present day.

The first record of name of this region as the Artland is in 1309. It continued to be used over the centuries but it never had a clear and permanent boundary.

A prerequisite for the economic independence of the Artland were its good natural regional conditions and the highly fertile soil in the Quakenbrück Basin. The gentle gradient of the river Hase in the lowlands below Bersenbrück facilitated the deposition of fertile alluvial sands from the Osnabrück Upland, resulting in very fertile farmland. The higher-lying Esch terrain was improved by fertilizing it with plaggen soils taken from the rich pastures. Alongside the keeping of livestock, which was the dominant form of farming throughout the Osnabrück Land until the Thirty Years' War, arable farming has always been carried out in the Artland which, in addition to oats and rye, also supported the more demanding and sought-after barley crops. Nowadays, however, the cultivation of maize is pre-eminent, as it is in the rest of the Weser-Ems region. This fertile arable soil, which contrasted with that of the rest of the Osnabrück Land where there were often shortages of grain, led in the "Corn chamber of the Bishopric of Osnabrück" to the development of a wealthy, landed upper class with numerous individual farmsteads which, together with hedges, copses and oak groves (Hofeichenkämpen), resulted in a park-like countryside.

The collective municipality of Artland, founded in 1972, covered Quakenbrück, Menslage and Badbergen, which represented only a part of the original heartland of the region, to which Gehrde also belonged and which, like Menslage, Quakenbrück and Badbergen, benefited from the fertile lowlands of the Hase river. Nortrup, by contrast, was not part of the Artland heartland. It first became politically and ecclesiastically independent of Ankum in the early 20th century, the first Roman Catholic parish being founded in 1908. Even Ankum is often counted as part of the Artland (Artland Cathedral), the village was however the centre point of the Farngau for centuries, to which Nortrup also belonged.

== Gallery ==
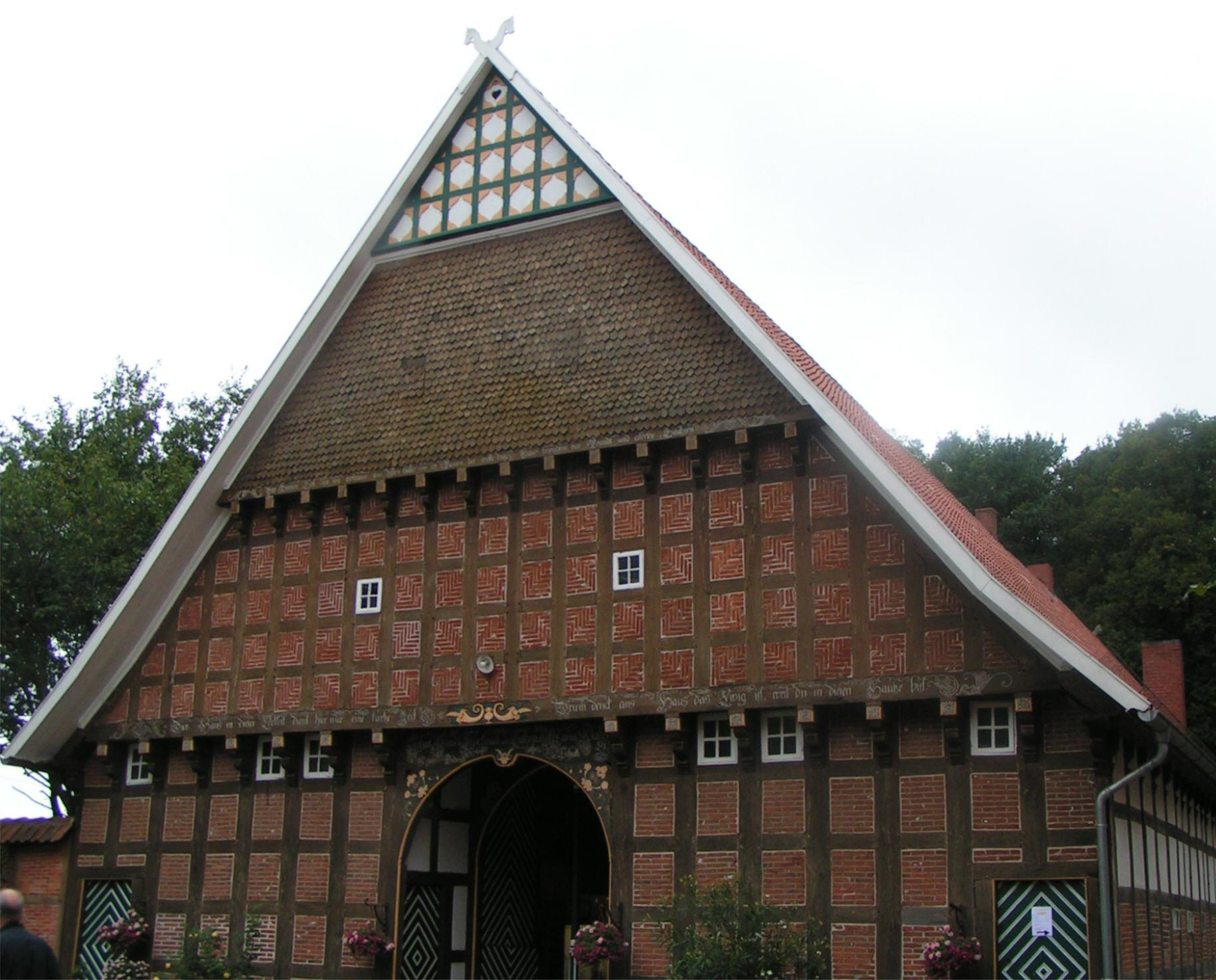
Farmhouse in Langen

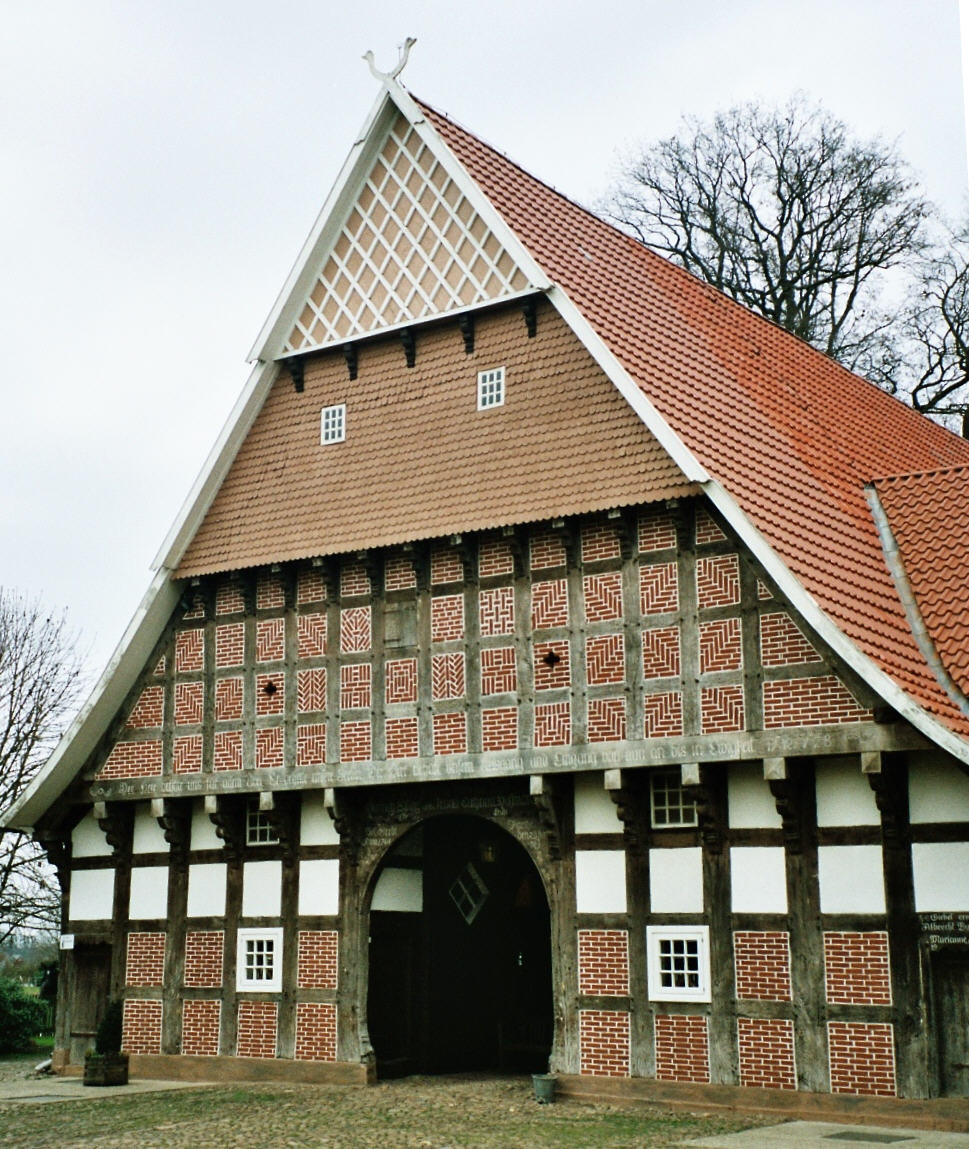
Farmhouse in Vehs

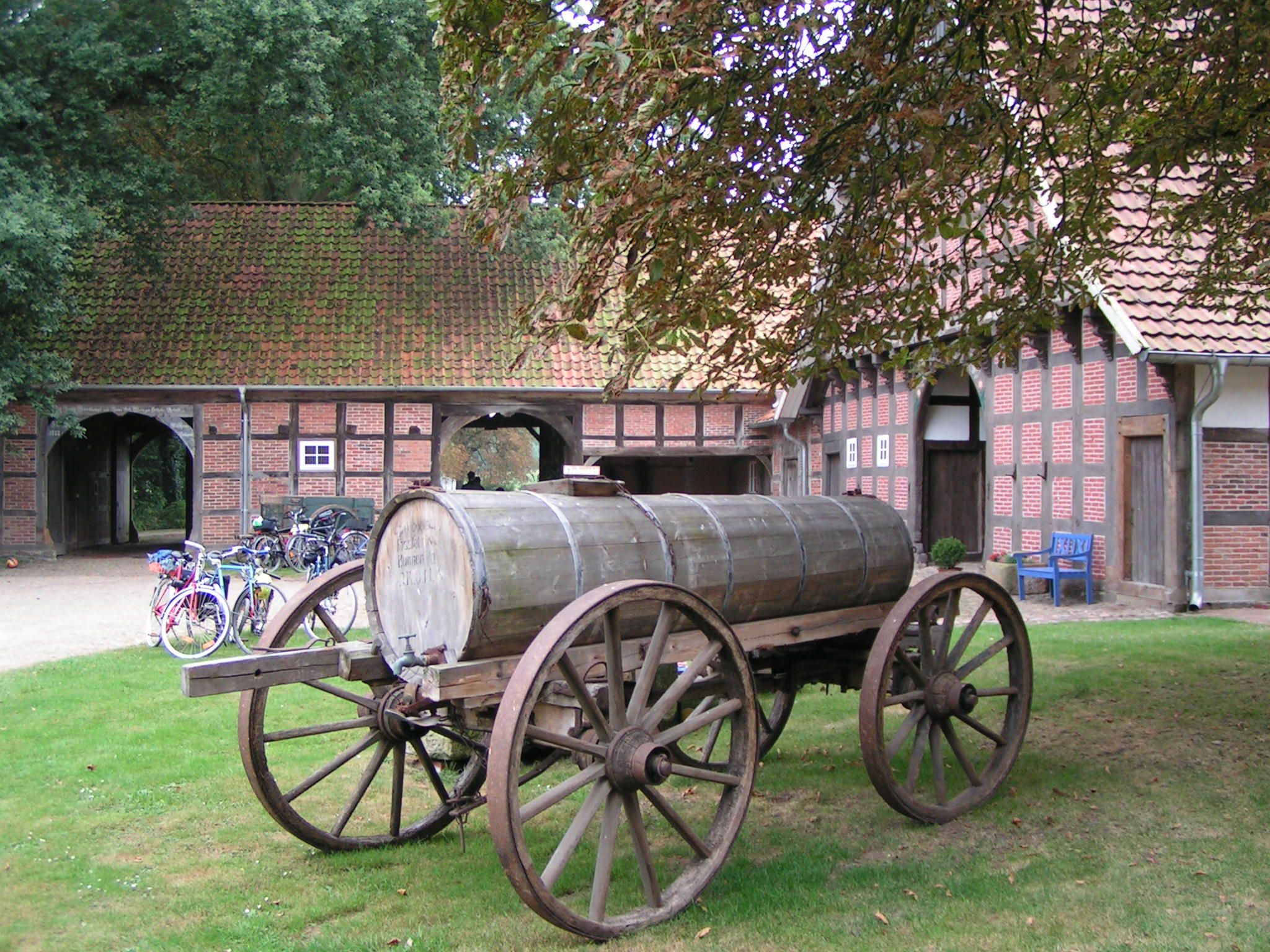
Courtyard in Grönloh

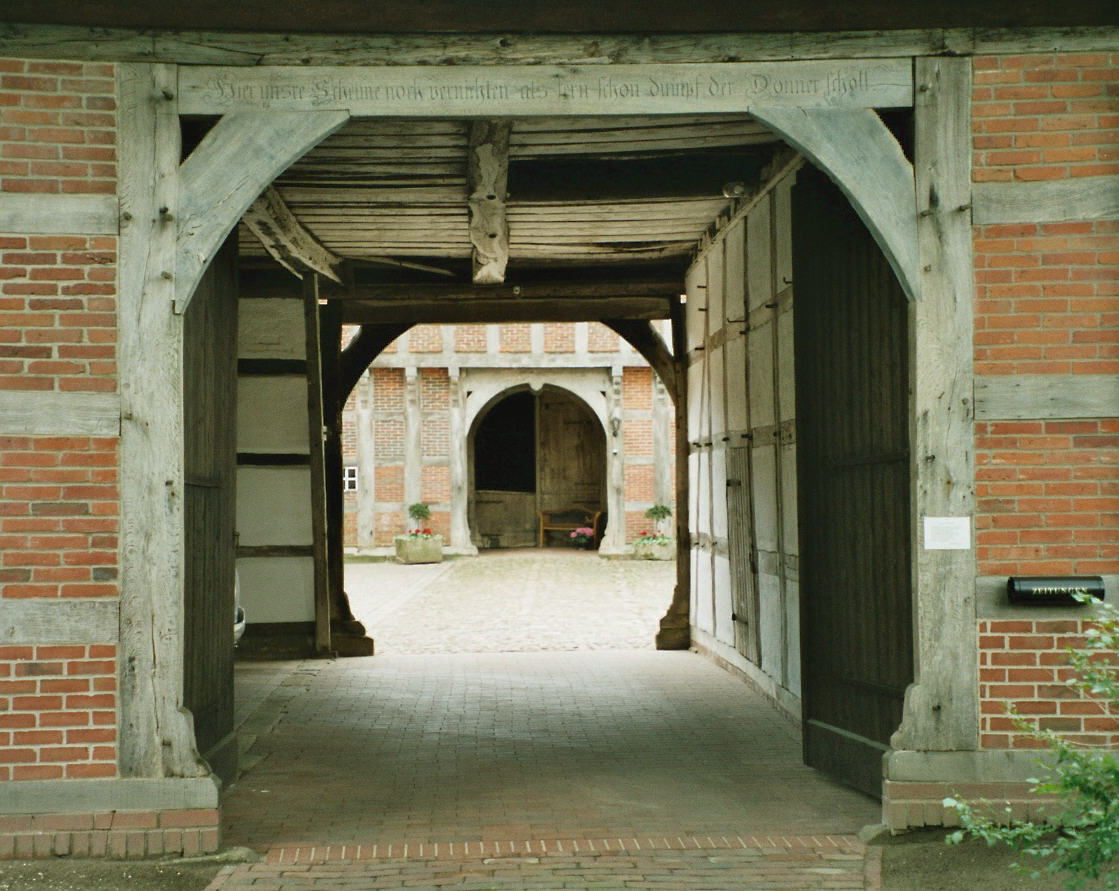
Courtyard in Lechterke

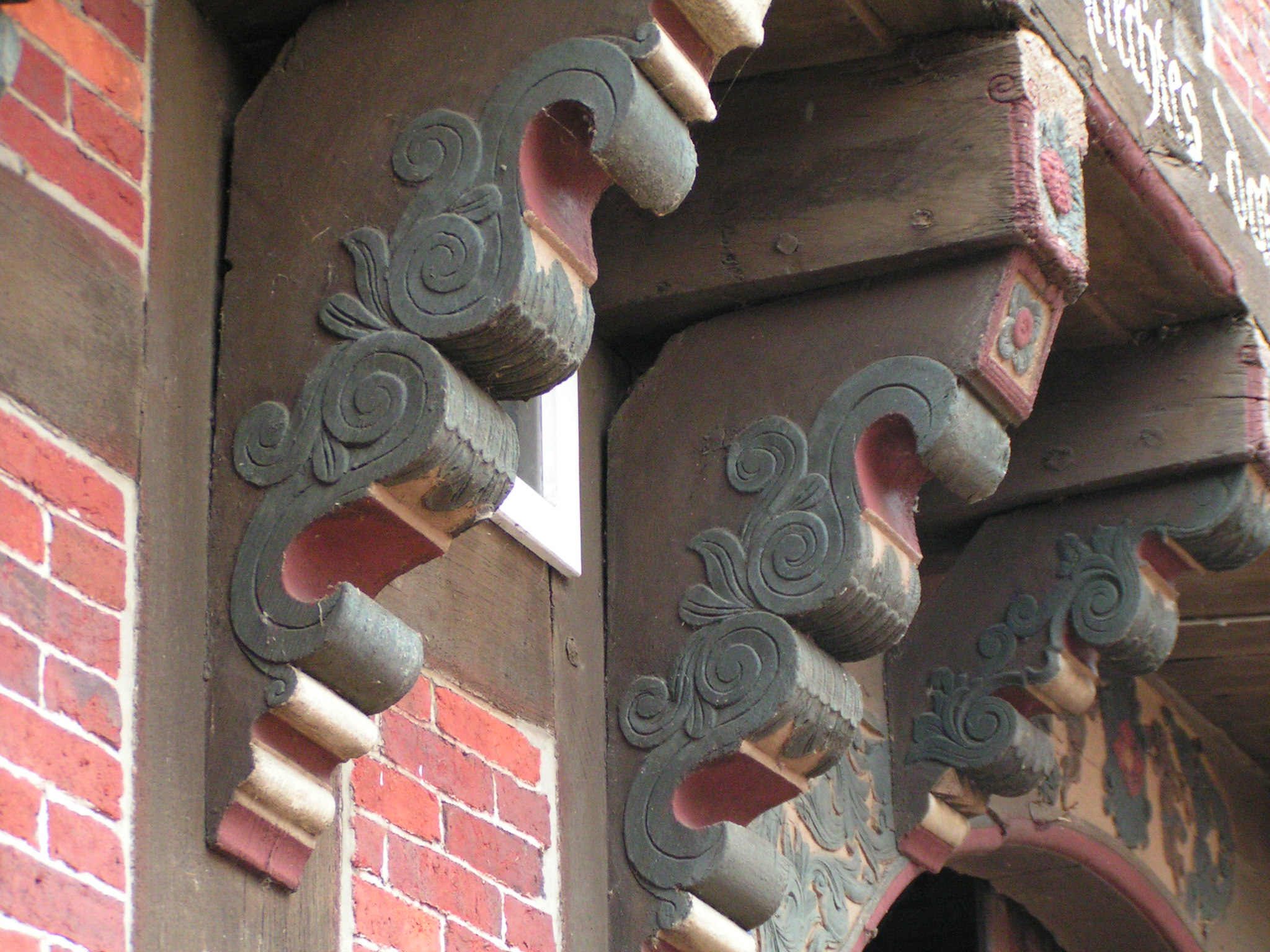
Knaggen on a farmhouse in Wulften

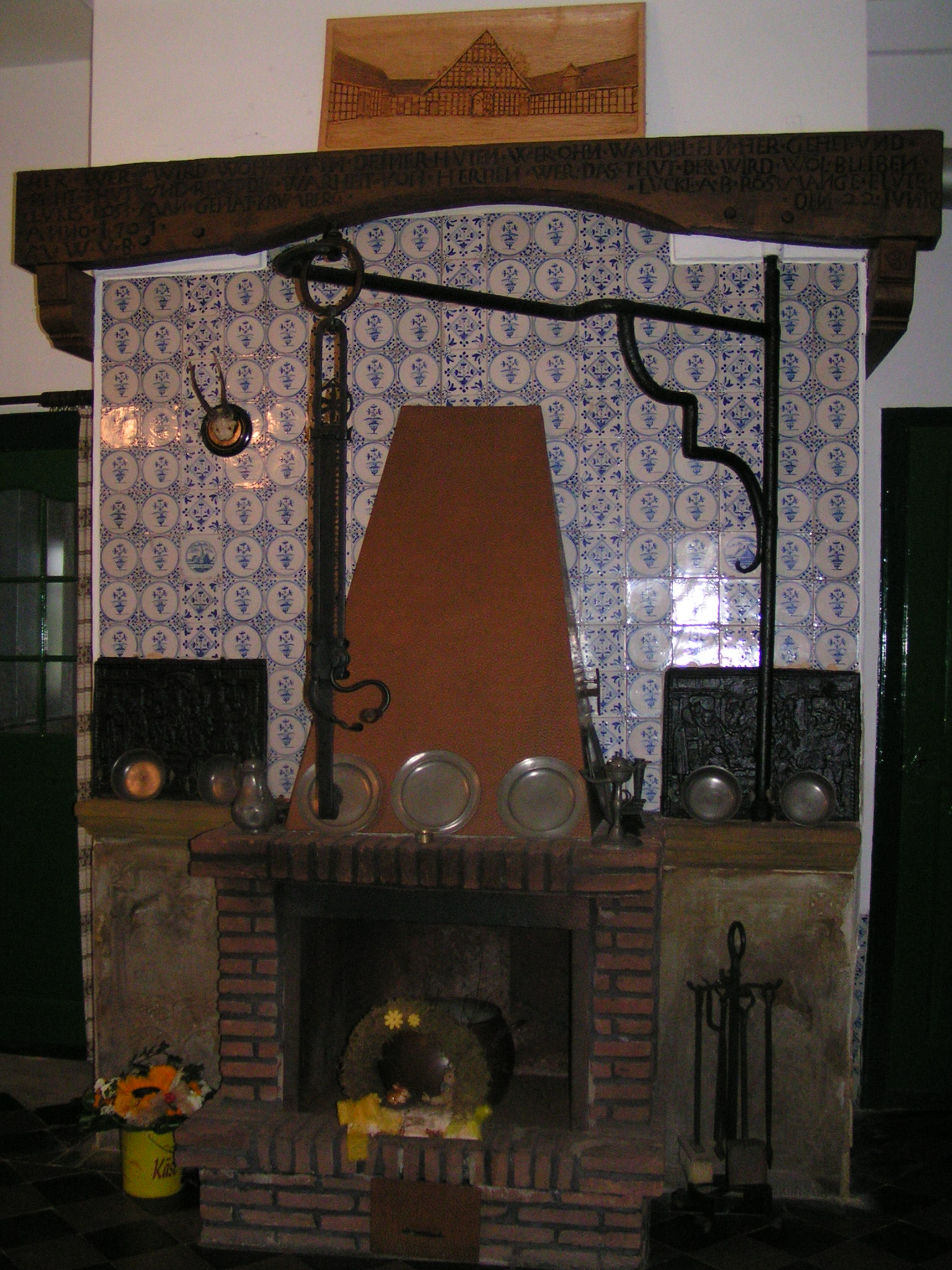
Hall of a farmhouse in Vehs

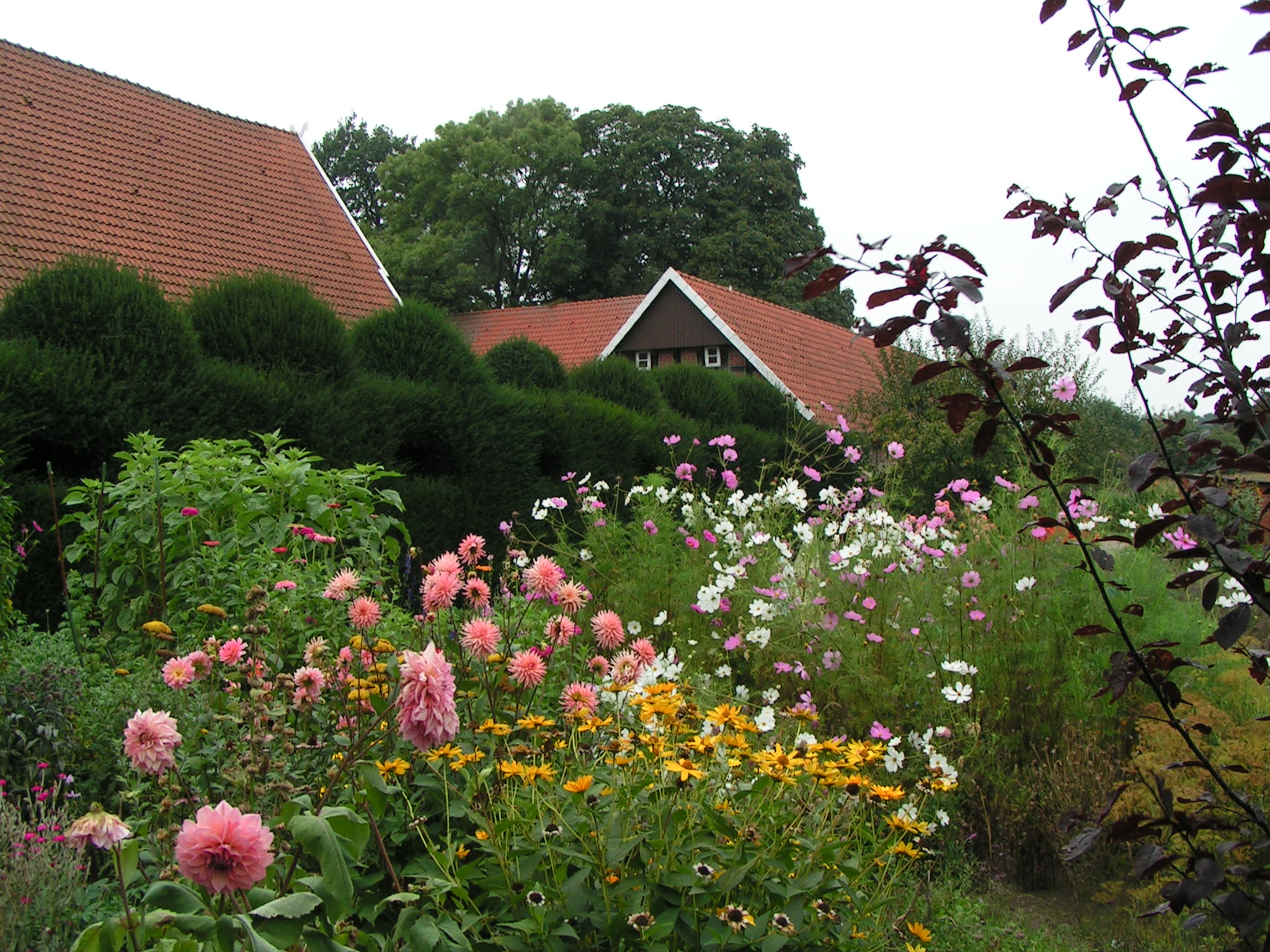
Farm garden in a courtyard in Wulften

== Tourism ==
Not until the 1990s did the features of Artland culture and countryside begin slowly to appear. To support the economy and tourism of the region the Artland Economic Agency (Wirtschaftsagentur Artland, WAAL) and ARTour (Artland Touristik) were founded. Every year on the "Open Day" (Tag des offenen Denkmals) (second weekend in September) many farms and other buildings in Artland may be visited.

In Quakenbrück the 142-kilometre-long holiday road, the Artland Route, begins and ends. The sights of the Artland may also be enjoyed on special cycleways, the Gable Tour (Giebeltour), the Art Tour (Kunsttour) and the Garden Tour (Gartentour).

== Sport ==
The name of the Quakenbrück basketball team is the Artland Dragons, named after the characteristic - and unique to the Artland Region - tradition of dragon head carvings on oak house beams and old decorative furniture.

== Literature ==
- Rolf Berner: Siedlungs-, Wirtschafts- und Sozialgeschichte des Artlandes bis zum Ausgang des Mittelalters. Kreisheimatbund Bersenbrück, 1965.
- Heinrich Böning, Heiko Bockstiegel: Das Artland im Bild. Badbergen, Menslage, Nortrup und Quakenbrück stellen sich vor. Published by the Quakenbrück Municipal Museum. Thoben, Quakenbrück 2006, 144 pages, ISBN 3-921176-98-0 (text in German, English and French)
- Hermann Dettmer: Volkstümliche Möbel aus dem Artland und den angrenzenden Gebieten. 4 volumes (text, coloured photos, sketches, maps). Cloppenburg, Museumsdorf, 1982- 1998, series: Materialien zur Volkskultur nordwestliches Niedersachsen, ed. by Helmut Ottenjann.
- Marie-Luise Hopf-Droste: Das bäuerliche Tagebuch. Fest und Alltag auf einem Artländer Bauernhof. 1873 - 1919. Materialien zur Volkskultur nordwestliches Niedersachsen (Issue 3). Dissertation (University of Münster). 2nd edition, Schuster, Leer 1982, 203 pages. ISBN 3-7963-0208-4
- Gudrun Kuhlmann: Das Artland und die Stadt Quakenbrück in ihrer historischen Entwicklung. Isensee, Oldenburg, 2004, 430 pages., ISBN 3-89995-009-7
- Christoph Reinders-Düselder: Das Artland. Demographische, soziale und politisch-herrschaftliche Entwicklungen zwischen 1650 und 1850 in einer Region des Osnabrücker Nordlandes. Materialien und Studien zur Alltagsgeschichte und Volkskultur Niedersachsens (Issue 32). Museumsdorf Cloppenburg, Cloppenburg, 2000, 238 pages., ISBN 3-923675-82-8
- Petra Reinken/Jutta Böning: Kulturschatz Artland. CulturCon, 2009. ISBN 978-3-941092-16-7
- Claudia und Christian Wüst: Das Artland. Kulturschatz im Nordwesten. Entdecken & erleben. Badbergen, Menslage, Nortrup, Stadt Quakenbrück. Reiseführer. Artland Atelier, Quakenbrück, 2006, 130 pages., ISBN 978-3-00-018542-7 or ISBN 3-00-018542-9

== Film ==
- Artland. From the series Landpartie - Im Norden unterwegs. German television documentary by Achim Tacke with Heike Götz, NDR 2008, 90 minutes
