= Recke =

- Town
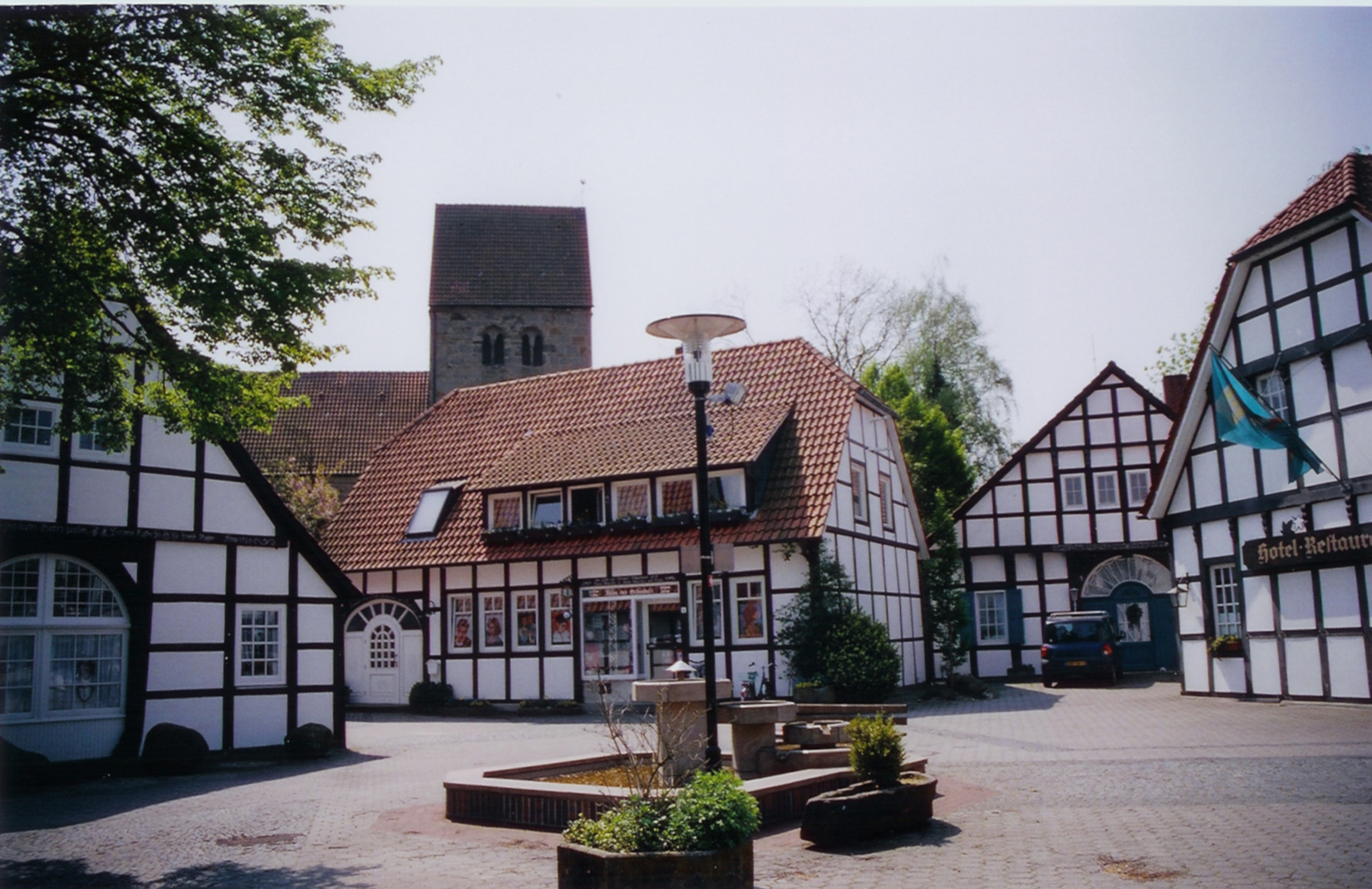
- Town Square in Recke

- Coat of arms

- Location of Recke within Steinfurt district
- Interactive map of Recke
- Location within Germany Location within North Rhine-Westphalia
- Coordinates: 52°22′12″N 7°43′08″E
- Country: Germany
- State: North Rhine-Westphalia
- Admin. region: Münster
- District: Steinfurt
- Subdivisions: 6

Government
  - Mayor (2020–25): Peter Vos

Area
  - Total: 53.69 km^{2} (20.73 sq mi)
- Elevation: 45–125 m (148–410 ft)

Population (2025-12-31)
  - Total: 11,427
  - Density: 212.8/km^{2} (551.2/sq mi)
- Time zone: UTC+01:00 (CET)
  - Summer (DST): UTC+02:00 (CEST)
- Postal codes: 49509
- Dialling codes: 05453
- Vehicle registration: ST
- Website: www.recke.de

Recke (German pronunciation: [ˈʁɛkə]; Westphalian: Riäke) is a municipality in the district of Steinfurt, in North Rhine-Westphalia, Germany.

== Geography ==
Recke is situated approximately 20 km north-east of Rheine and 25 km north-west of Osnabrück.

=== Neighbouring municipalities ===
- Ibbenbüren
- Hopsten
- Mettingen
- Voltlage
- Neuenkirchen

== Population ==
Historical population

Year	Pop.	±% p.a.
1965	8,287	—
1970	8,983	+1.63%
1975	8,962	−0.05%
1980	9,122	+0.35%
1985	9,480	+0.77%
1990	10,026	+1.13%
1995	10,869	+1.63%

Year	Pop.	±% p.a.
2000	11,618	+1.34%
2005	11,842	+0.38%
2010	11,578	−0.45%
2015	11,363	−0.37%
2020	11,394	+0.05%
2025	11,427	+0.06%

Source: Landesdatabank Nordrhein-Westfalen

=== Sons and daughters of Recke ===
- Hans-Jürgen Klein (born 1952), politician (Alliance 90 / The Greens), member of the Lower Saxony Landtag
- Erich Rutemöller (born 1945 in Recke-Steinbeck), football coach

=== People who are connected to the place ===
- Simon Rolfes (born 1982), German national football player, grew up in Recke

== Twin town ==
- Ommen (Overijssel, Netherlands)
