= Hans Klein (disambiguation) =

Hans Klein may refer to:

- Hans Klein (1981–1944), German military aviator
- Hans Klein (politician) (1931–1996), German politician (CDU), member and vice president of the Bundestag
- Hans Hugo Klein (born 1936), German politician (CDU) in the Bundestag and justice of the Federal Constitutional Court
- Hans-Günter Klein (1939–2016), German musicologist, librarian, art historian, LGBT activist and researcher
- Hans-Joachim Klein (swimmer) (born 1942), German retired freestyle swimmer at the 1960 and 1964 Olympics
- Hans-Joachim Klein (1947–2022), German left-wing militant and a member of the Revolutionary Cells group
- Hans-Jürgen Klein (born 1952), German politician for Alliance'90/TheGreens in the Lower Saxony Landtag
