= Hunteburg =

Coordinates: 52.4369°N 8.2736°E

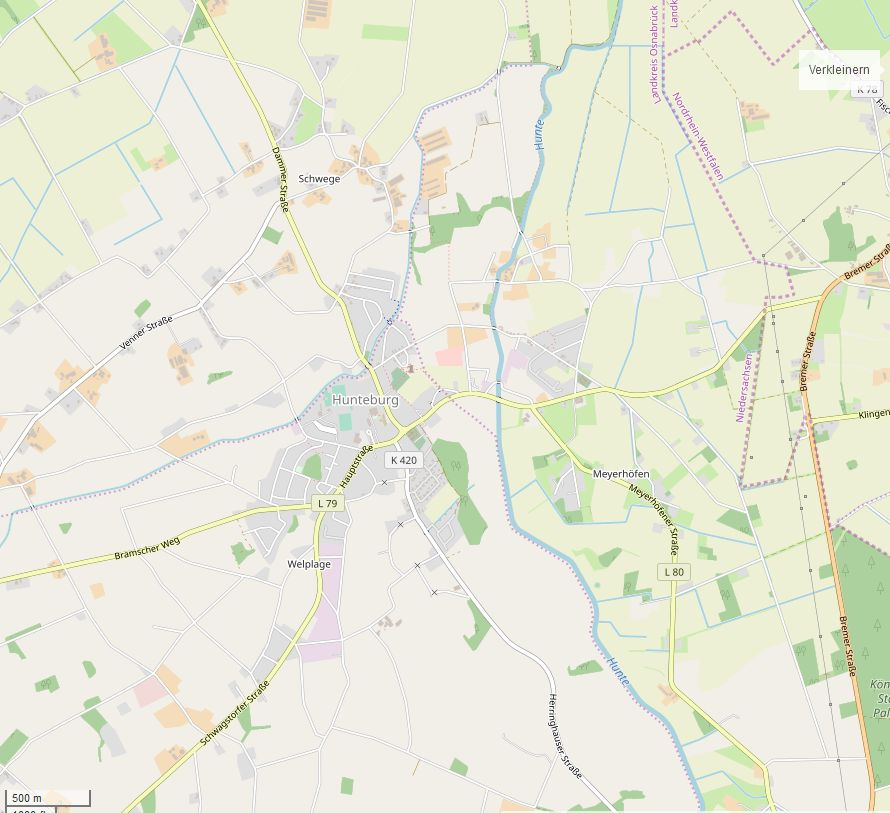

Hunteburg is a village in the municipality of Bohmte and the district of Osnabrück, in Lower Saxony, Germany. In Hunteburg are living about 4,000 people. Hunteburg consists of the districts Schwege, Welplage and Meyerhöfen, these three districts were up to the local government reform in 1972, the Municipality Hunteburg.

== Geography and climate ==
Hunteburg is located in the south of the second largest lake named Dümmer and in the north of the Wiehengebirge. The Hunte flows from the Wiehengebirge coming through Hunteburg in the Dümmer. With annual rainfall 650-700 and a mean annual air temperature of 8.4 degrees Celsius Hunteburg belongs to the maritime-influenced climate sub-continental region of the North German lowlands.

== History ==
=== Middle Ages ===
1248 for the first time the knights of Schwege was mentioned that on a same good had its headquarters. The first mention Welplages goes back to the year 1306. Hunteburg is first mentioned in a document from 1324, in which the knight Friedrich von Schwege the Osnabrück Bishop Gottfried Graf von Arnsberg suitable land for the Hunteburg. The Hunteburg castle belonged to a series of pin castles with which the bishops of Osnabrück secured the border of the Bishopric of Osnabrück 1250–1370. Little is known about the Hunteburg the plant. What is certain is that it consisted of a stone house that was surrounded by a wooden enclosure and fed by the Hunte grave system. Still preserved today is a stone arch bridge built in 1424 that is considered the oldest building in Hunteburg. 1378 the Office Hunteburg was established, which included the present-day communities Bohmte and Ostercappeln. At the end of the 14th century, Bishop Friedrich von Horn founded a chapel in 1402 from a priest from Ostercappeln saying mass. In 1492 Hunteburg was given its own parish. Shortly thereafter, the Three Kings consecrated early Gothic wooden church was built. Towards the end of the 16th century, it fell into the Hunteburg that was completely demolished in 1618.

=== Reformation and the Thirty Years' War ===
In a report on the Church of Visitation in 1624, it is stated that Pastor Kling Hammer holds in the Church simultaneous services for both denominations. 1633 the Church of Swedish troops was set on fire. In accordance with the provisions of the Treaty of Westphalia Treaty and the decisions at the Diet of Nuremberg of 1650 people in the Bishopric of Osnabrück Perpetual surrender (Capitulatio perpetua osnabrugensis) were guaranteed the free exercise of religion. The Hunteburger Church was awarded the Catholic community and left two denominations for use. The simultaneous relationship went through on the church built in 1688. However, the evangelical Christians did not use the church but attended religious services in Dielingen and Venne.

=== 18th and 19th century ===
In 1725 a new office building was built on the foundations of Hunteburg. In 1776 a school for Protestant children was built in Meyerhöfen. During the Napoleonic Wars Hunteburg changed at the beginning of the 19th century, several times the country's membership. 1803, the Bishopric was secularized and declared the principality of Osnabrueck. In 1806 Hunteburg the Kingdom of Prussia, 1807 to the Kingdom of Westphalia, in 1811 it became part of the French Empire and in 1815 it became part of the Congress of Vienna the Newly created Kingdom of Hanover. The Office Hunteburg was merged with the Office Wittlage. From 1852 to 1859, the two offices were again separated for several years. In 1866 Hunteburg and the Kingdom of Hanover fell to Prussia. Since 1885, the two former offices Wittlage and Hunteburg formed the district Wittlage.

1815 an Evangelical Lutheran church was founded by Protestants from Welplage and Schwege. On 15 April of the same year, the first Lutheran church in Hunteburg, St. Matthew Church, was founded.

=== 20th century ===
Since the beginning of the 20th century, industrial peat has been mined in Hunteburg. Founded in 1909 Hanoverian colonization and mud recovery Aktiengesellschaft (Hakumag built in Schwegermoor a power plant with an electrical capacity of 2.6 megawatts. From the peat sulphate of ammonia by charring should be recovered as nitrogen fertilizer. The waste methane gas was used to generate electricity. Opened in 1911, the Hakumag the work. Since the delivered Torfmengen is not sufficient due to the long drying process, the power plant was shut down in 1913. In the following years, the Hakumag limited to the sale of white and black peat. In the 1920s and 1930s, seasonal workers were employed, among others, from the Netherlands and Slovakia in the bog. During World War II the Hakumag used forced laborers as well as Polish and Russian prisoners of war.

The work awarded the town an economic boost. For the workers who built the Hakumag Schwegermoorsiedlung. With the extension of the route of the Wittlager circular path of Bohmte Damme, Hunteburg received a connection to the railway network in 1914. In 1971, the last passenger train on the track, 2004, the freight was discontinued.

1928 a new school building for children from Welplage Schwege and was built in Welplage, were housed in each one Catholic and one Protestant school. In the 1960s, 1970s and 1990s, the school was expanded several times. In 1972, the two denominational schools merged to form a school for children of all denominations.

In the general area of reform became the first July 1972, the Samtgemeinde Hunteburg dissolved and its three member communities Schwege, Welplage and Meyerhöfen incorporated into the municipality Bohmte.

== Sources ==
- Jan de Vries, Peter Gausmann, Herbert Telscher, Norbert Kroboth (1974): 650 Years Hunteburg.
- Landscape Plan of the Municipality of Bohmte. GfL Planning and Engineering Company GmbH, Bremen.
- Hans Schweinefuß, Bernhard Uhle (2000): The Wittlager Circular Path.
- Old Hunteburg (1998). Home Club Hunteburg (Editor).
- Ulrich Beckvermert, Maria Düvel, Franz-Josef Trent man Alfons Vallo (2001): Our Time in God's Hands. Chronicle of the Catholic Parish Hunteburg.
- Website of the Municipality of Bohmte.
- Lower Saxony Country People, Hunteburg Local Association (figures for agriculture).
