= Bersenbrück (Samtgemeinde) =

- Samtgemeinde
- Coat of arms

- Location of Bersenbrück within Osnabrück district
- Interactive map of Bersenbrück
- Location within Germany Location within Lower Saxony
- Coordinates: 52°33′19″N 07°56′47″E
- Country: Germany
- State: Lower Saxony
- District: Osnabrück
- Subdivisions: 7 municipalities

Government
  - Mayor (2020–25): Michael Wernke (CDU)

Area
  - Total: 255.45 km^{2} (98.63 sq mi)
- Elevation: 33 m (108 ft)

Population (2025-12-31)
  - Total: 30,279
  - Density: 118.53/km^{2} (307.00/sq mi)
- Time zone: UTC+01:00 (CET)
  - Summer (DST): UTC+02:00 (CEST)
- Postal codes: 49577, 49593–49597
- Dialling codes: 05436, 05439, 05462, 05464, 05471
- Vehicle registration: OS, BSB, MEL, WTL
- Website: bersenbrueck.de

Bersenbrück is a Samtgemeinde ("collective municipality") in the district of Osnabrück, in Lower Saxony, Germany. Its seat is in the town Bersenbrück.

The Samtgemeinde Bersenbrück consists of the following municipalities:

- Alfhausen
- Ankum
- Bersenbrück
- Eggermühlen
- Gehrde
- Kettenkamp
- Rieste

== Population ==
Year	Residents
1990	5,767
2001	7,762
2011	7,787
2022	8,248
2024	8,221
