= Lingen Heights =

Coordinates: 52.5187°N 7.5049°E

The Lingen Heights (German: Lingener Höhe) is a Hügelland, or landscape of low, rolling hills, up to 91 metres high, in the North German Plain in the western part of the north German state of Lower Saxony.

== Geography ==
The densely forested Lingen Heights, that are about 14 kilometres long and only a few kilometres wide, lie in the Emsland about 10 kilometres east-southeast of the town of Lingen in the district of Emsland immediately bordering on the district of Osnabrück to the east. They lie between Lingen in the west and Fürstenau in the east as well as Lengerich in the northeast, Thuine in the middle and Freren in the southeast.

North of the Lingen Heights, on the other side of the Hase river is the Hümmling range, to the east are the Ankum Heights, to the southeast are the northwestern foothills of the Teutoburg Forest in Tecklenburg Land.

== Hills ==
Amongst the high points in the Lingen Heights are the:

- Windmühlenberg (91 m)
- Queckeberg (73 m)
- Tillberg (73 m)
- Bramberg (69 m)
- Wellberg (ca. 62 m)
- Hilgenberg (59 m)
- Radberg (58 m)
