= Bundesautobahn 392 =

Federal motorway in Germany

A 392
- Bundesautobahn 392
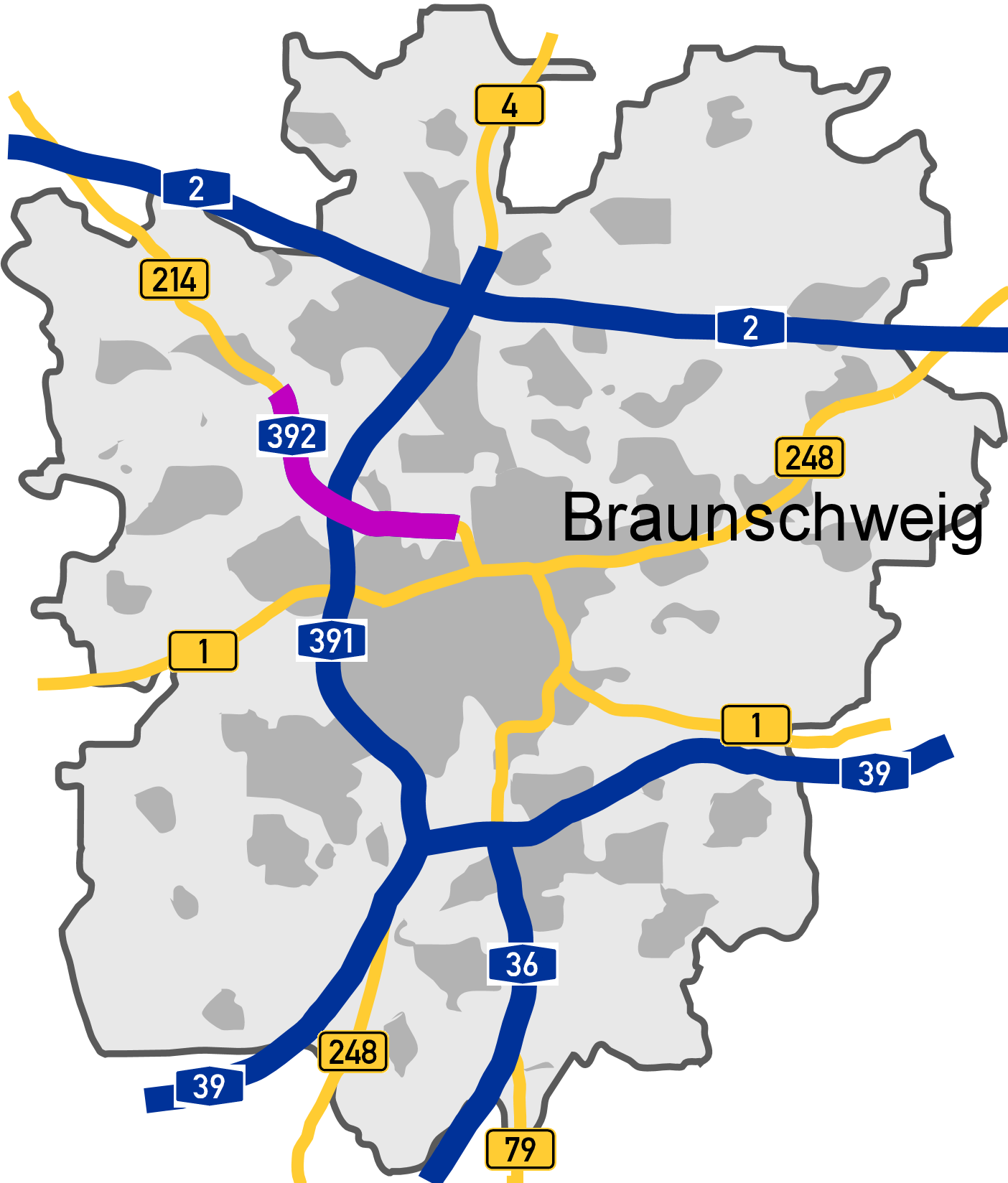

Route information
- Length: 3 km (1.9 mi)

Location
- Country: Germany
- States: Lower Saxony

Highway system
- Roads in Germany; Autobahns; List; Federal; List; State; E-roads

Bundesautobahn 392 (translates from German as Federal Motorway 392, short form Autobahn 392, abbreviated as BAB 392 or A 392) is an autobahn spur in Braunschweig. A proposed extension to the A 2 was deemed not feasible and will likely not be built.

== Exit list ==
	Braunschweig-Watenbüttel-Nord (planned)
	Mittellandkanalbrücke (planned)
(3)	Braunschweig-Watenbüttel-Ost B 214
(4)	Ölper 4-way interchange A 391
(5)	Braunschweig-Celler Straße
	Okerbrücke 260 m
(6)	Braunschweig-Hamburger Straße
