= Bohmte =

- Municipality
- Coat of arms

- Location of Bohmte within Osnabrück district
- Interactive map of Bohmte
- Location within Germany Location within Lower Saxony
- Coordinates: 52°22′N 8°19′E
- Country: Germany
- State: Lower Saxony
- District: Osnabrück
- Subdivisions: 3 Ortsteile

Government
  - Mayor (2023–28): Markus Kleinkauertz (CDU)

Area
  - Total: 110.73 km^{2} (42.75 sq mi)
- Elevation: 49 m (161 ft)

Population (2025-12-31)
  - Total: 13,139
  - Density: 118.66/km^{2} (307.32/sq mi)
- Time zone: UTC+01:00 (CET)
  - Summer (DST): UTC+02:00 (CEST)
- Postal codes: 49163
- Dialling codes: 05471 (Bohmte), 05475 (Hunteburg)
- Vehicle registration: OS, BSB, MEL, WTL
- Website: www.bohmte.de

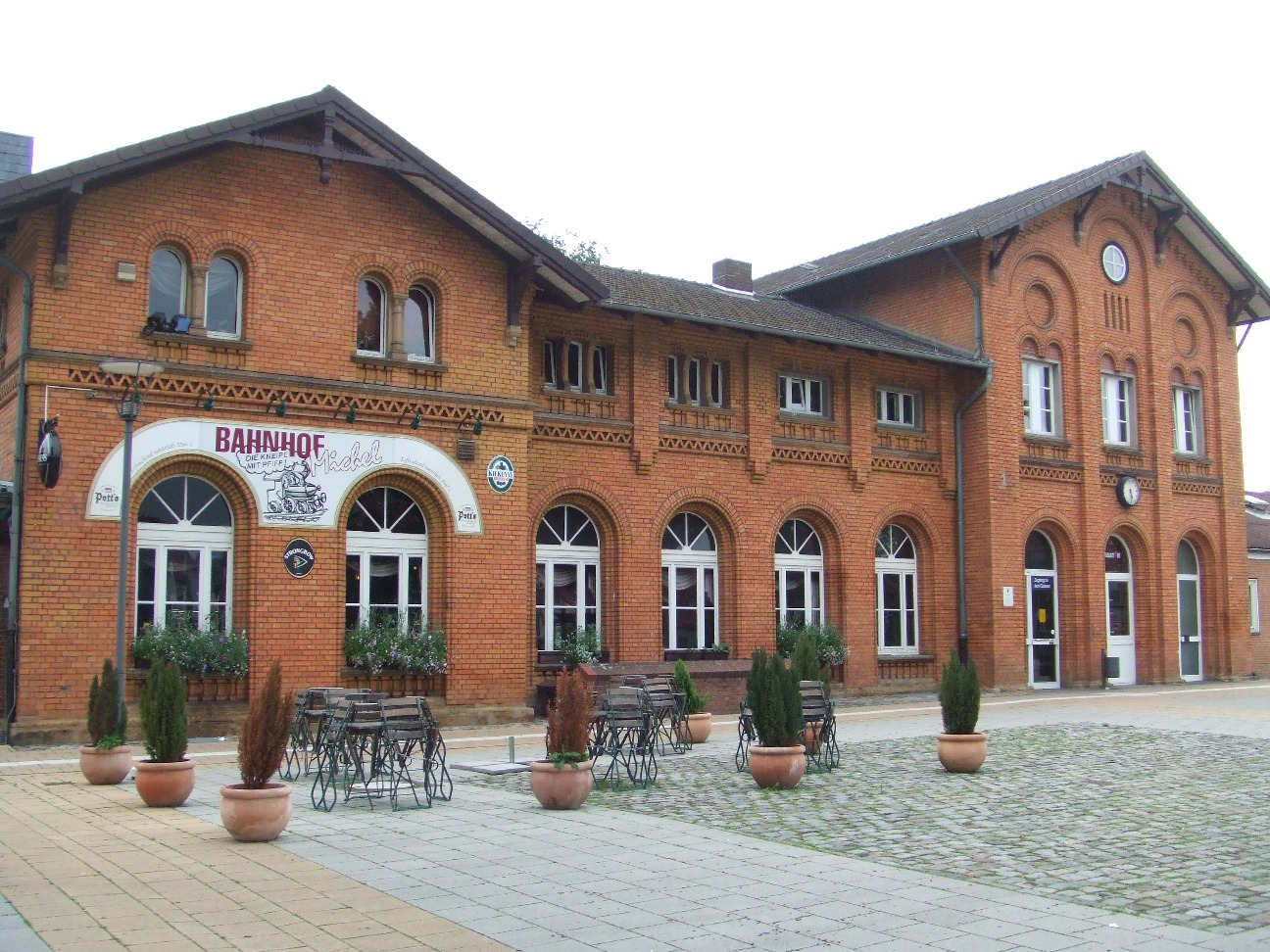
Bohmte railway station

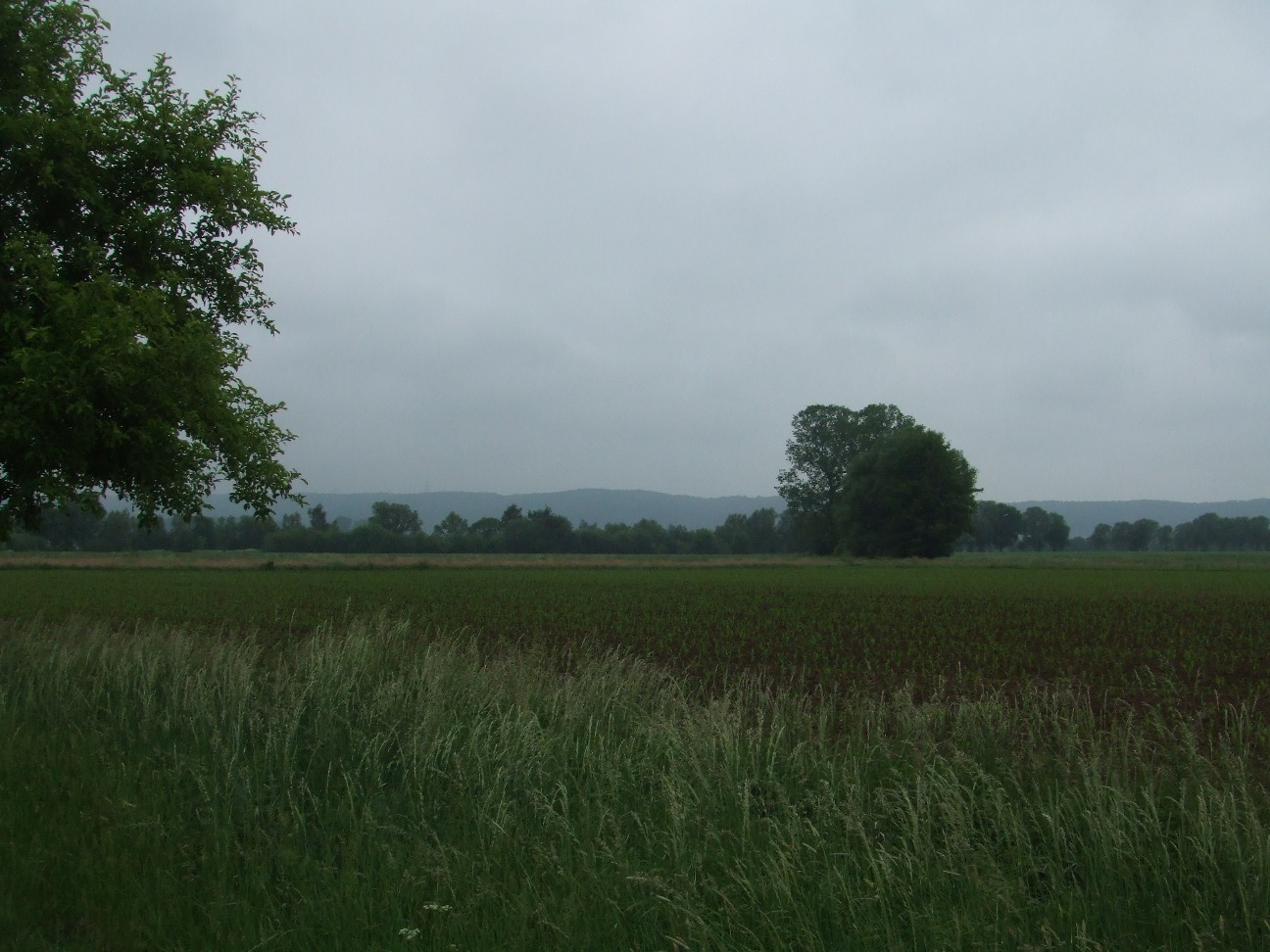
The Stirper Bruch grazing area

Bohmte (German pronunciation: [ˈboːmtə]) is a municipality in the district of Osnabrück, in Lower Saxony, Germany. It is situated on the river Hunte, approx. 20 km northeast of Osnabrück. The foundation of today's Bohmte is a result of the regional reorganization of 1972, when the towns of Bohmte, Herringhausen-Stirpe-Oelingen and Hunteburg were consolidated.

Bohmte introduced a new road system in September 2007, designed to reduce the dominance of the motor vehicle. It is hoped that the scheme, which is based on the shared space philosophy, will improve road safety in the town.

== Politics ==
=== Parish council ===
Apportionment at the parish council as of 2016 till 2021:

- CDU 13 seats
- SPD 12 seats
- FDP 2 seats
- Alliance 90/The Greens 3 seats
- Die Linke 2 seats

=== Town twinnings ===
- Gützkow, Vorpommern-Greifswald, Mecklenburg-Vorpommern (since 1991)
- Bolbec, Seine-Maritime, France (since 1966)

== Education and culture ==
- Erich Kästner-Schule (Primary education for all religions)
- Christophorus-Schule (Primary education for the Roman Catholic)
- Grundschule Herringhausen (Primary education in Herringhausen)
- Oberschule Bohmte
- Wilhelm-Busch-Schule (Primary education and Hauptschule)
- Astrid-Lindgren-Schule (for the disabled)

== Famous persons ==
- Karl Janisch (born 1870 in Berlin; died 1946 in Schwegermoor) Architect
- Reinhold Tiling (born 13. Juni 1893 in Absberg/Franken; died 11. October 1933 in Osnabruck) Engineer, pilot and pioneer in rockets
- Rudolf Seiters (born 13. October 1937 in Osnabrück) German politician (CDU)

== Regular festivals and meetings ==
=== Festivals ===
- "Spass auf der Straß" (Fun on the street) – last weekend in April
- Marksmen's festival in the Bohmterheide – Whitsuntide
- Marksmen's festival in Bohmte – first weekend in July
- Marksmen's festival in Stirpe-Oelingen – second weekend in July
- Marksmen's festival in Hunteburg – fourth weekend in July

=== Markets ===
- "Tag der offenen Tür" (Open doors day) at Bohmte/Bad Essen aerodrome – May Day
- Harvest festival in Herringhausen-Stirpe-Oelingen with harvest market – first weekend in September
- Bohmter Markt (Bohmte market) – fourth weekend in September
- North-German pony market in Hunteburg – second weekend in October

=== Christmas markets ===
- Sankt Nikolaus market in Bohmte – second Sunday of Advent
- Christmas market in Hunteburg – third Sunday of Advent

== Famous buildings ==
- Bohmte railway station
- Church of St John the Baptist
- Church of St Thomas
- Bohmter Kotten (cottage, inhabits the library)
