= Ankum =

- Municipality
- Coat of arms

- Location of Ankum within Osnabrück district
- Interactive map of Ankum
- Location within Germany Location within Lower Saxony
- Coordinates: 52°32′36″N 07°52′15″E
- Country: Germany
- State: Lower Saxony
- District: Osnabrück
- Municipal assoc.: Bersenbrück

Government
  - Mayor: Detert Brummer-Bange

Area
  - Total: 66.32 km^{2} (25.61 sq mi)
- Elevation: 54 m (177 ft)

Population (2025-12-31)
  - Total: 8,085
  - Density: 121.9/km^{2} (315.7/sq mi)
- Time zone: UTC+01:00 (CET)
  - Summer (DST): UTC+02:00 (CEST)
- Postal codes: 49577
- Dialling codes: 05462
- Vehicle registration: OS, BSB, MEL, WTL
- Website: www.ankum.de

Ankum is a municipality in the district of Osnabrück, in Lower Saxony, Germany. From the Parish Ankum many people had emigrated to the Netherlands until 1800 and later to the USA.

The parish Ankum includes the municipalities Ankum village (=Dorf), Ahausen-Sitter, Aslage, Basum-Sussum since June 1972 municipal Eggermühlen; Besten with Krevinghausen and Striekel since 1972 municipality Eggermühlen, Brickwedde with Stockum and Westrup since 1972, Bokel since 1972 municipality Bersenbrück, Bockraden and Doethen since 1972 municipality Eggermühlen, Kettenkamp, Nortrup-Loxten, Rüssel, Talge since 1972 municipality Bersenbrück, Tütingen, Westerholte.

Today the unless otherwise stated municipalities constitute the village Ankum.

== People ==
- Georg Preuße (born 1950), actor
- Heinrich Arminius Rattermann (1832-1923), writer, historian, entrepreneur
