= Grönegau =

Historic region of Lower Saxony, Germany

The Grönegau (also Graingau) is the historic regional name for one of the many Saxon Gaus that have survived to the present day. The region was first mentioned in the records in 852. The Grönegau is a region that, for the most part, covers the same area as that of the present borough of Melle in the district of Osnabrück in the German state of Lower Saxony. From around 800 to the 12th century the old southern Gau border probably ran from Borgholzhausen and Halle to Bünde and Spenge in the east. The Amt of Grönenberg was first mentioned in 1360. Subsequently, it lost parts of the Grönegau of the Early Middle Ages, including Halle, Borgholzhausen and Borgloh. From 1852 there are no longer any boundary changes, the extent of the Amt of Grönenberg is from this date identical with the later district of Melle and finally, from 1972, the borough of Melle. Several societies in the region still carry the name Grönegau. Even the motorway services near Melle on the A 30 motorway carry this ancient regional name.
