= Georg Preuße =

German actor and drag performer (born 1950)

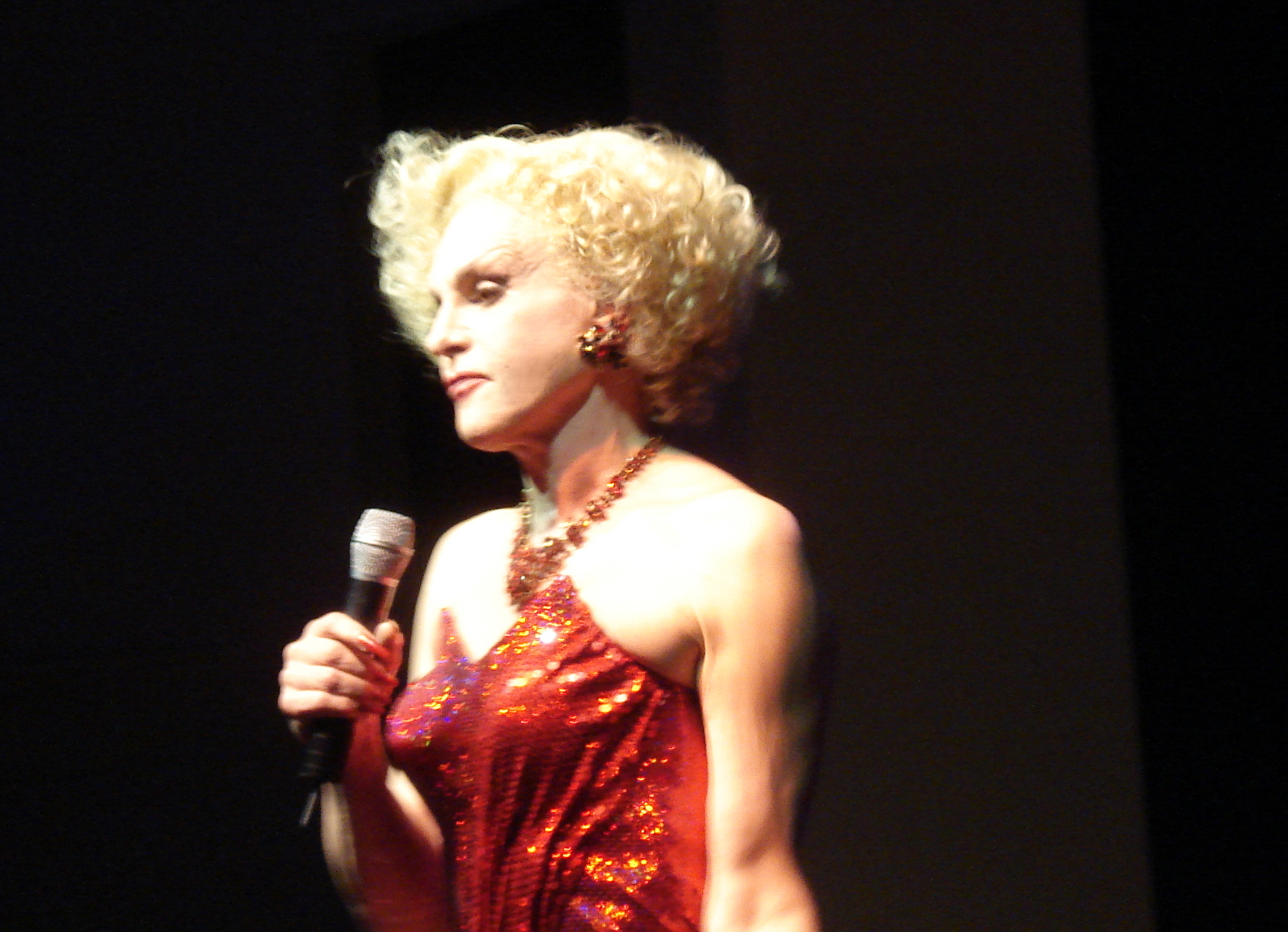
Georg Preuße (Mary Morgan), 2009.

Georg Preuße (Pseudonym Mary Morgan) (born 24 August 1950 in Ankum) is a German actor and drag performer.

== Life ==
After school in Ankum, Preuße became a radio and television engineer. He later started performing in shows and clubs as an actor En travesti. In the 1980s, nationally famous in Germany, he first played the role of Mary Morgan. He worked together with actor Reiner Kohler, who played Gordy Blanche. In the 1990s and 2000s, Preuße played different roles in German theatre.

Preuße, who is openly gay, lives in Berlin and Switzerland.

== Works by Preuße ==
=== Theatre ===
- Musical Cabaret - Conferencier

=== TV ===
- "Mary & Gordy"-Shows: Spaß an der Verwandlung 1- 3
- Mary-Shows. 25 editions (with gags, songs, dance and talkshows)
- Mary-Revues: Die frech-frivole Illusion. Sternschnuppen.
- TV moderations: Marys Quiz - Baden-Badener Roulette

=== Film ===
- Mary & Gordy auf dem Land
- Frau'n Frau'n Frau'n
- Marys verrücktes Krankenhaus
- Derrick – "Das erste aller Lieder"

== Awards ==
- 1990: Goldene Kamera for Mary and Gordy
