= Rieste =

- Municipality
- Coat of arms

- Location of Rieste within Osnabrück district
- Interactive map of Rieste
- Location within Germany Location within Lower Saxony
- Coordinates: 52°29′N 8°01′E
- Country: Germany
- State: Lower Saxony
- District: Osnabrück
- Municipal assoc.: Bersenbrück

Government
  - Mayor: Sebastian Hüdepohl (CDU)

Area
  - Total: 30.59 km^{2} (11.81 sq mi)
- Elevation: 39 m (128 ft)

Population (2025-12-31)
  - Total: 3,620
  - Density: 118/km^{2} (306/sq mi)
- Time zone: UTC+01:00 (CET)
  - Summer (DST): UTC+02:00 (CEST)
- Postal codes: 49597
- Dialling codes: 05464 (Alfhausen)
- Vehicle registration: OS, BSB, MEL, WTL
- Website: www.rieste.de

Rieste (German pronunciation: [ˈʁiːstə]) is a municipality in the district of Osnabrück, in Lower Saxony, Germany.

== Mayor ==
In November 2011 Sebastian Hüdepohl was elected the new mayor. He is the successor of Anton Harms, who was in office since 1996.
