= Merzen =

- Municipality
- Coat of arms

- Location of Merzen within Osnabrück district
- Interactive map of Merzen
- Location within Germany Location within Lower Saxony
- Coordinates: 52°28′42″N 7°49′52″E
- Country: Germany
- State: Lower Saxony
- District: Osnabrück
- Municipal assoc.: Neuenkirchen
- Subdivisions: 6

Government
  - Mayor: Gregor Schröder (CDU)

Area
  - Total: 53.05 km^{2} (20.48 sq mi)
- Elevation: 86 m (282 ft)

Population (2025-12-31)
  - Total: 3,678
  - Density: 69.33/km^{2} (179.6/sq mi)
- Time zone: UTC+01:00 (CET)
  - Summer (DST): UTC+02:00 (CEST)
- Postal codes: 49586
- Dialling codes: 05466
- Vehicle registration: OS, BSB, MEL, WTL
- Website: www.merzen.de

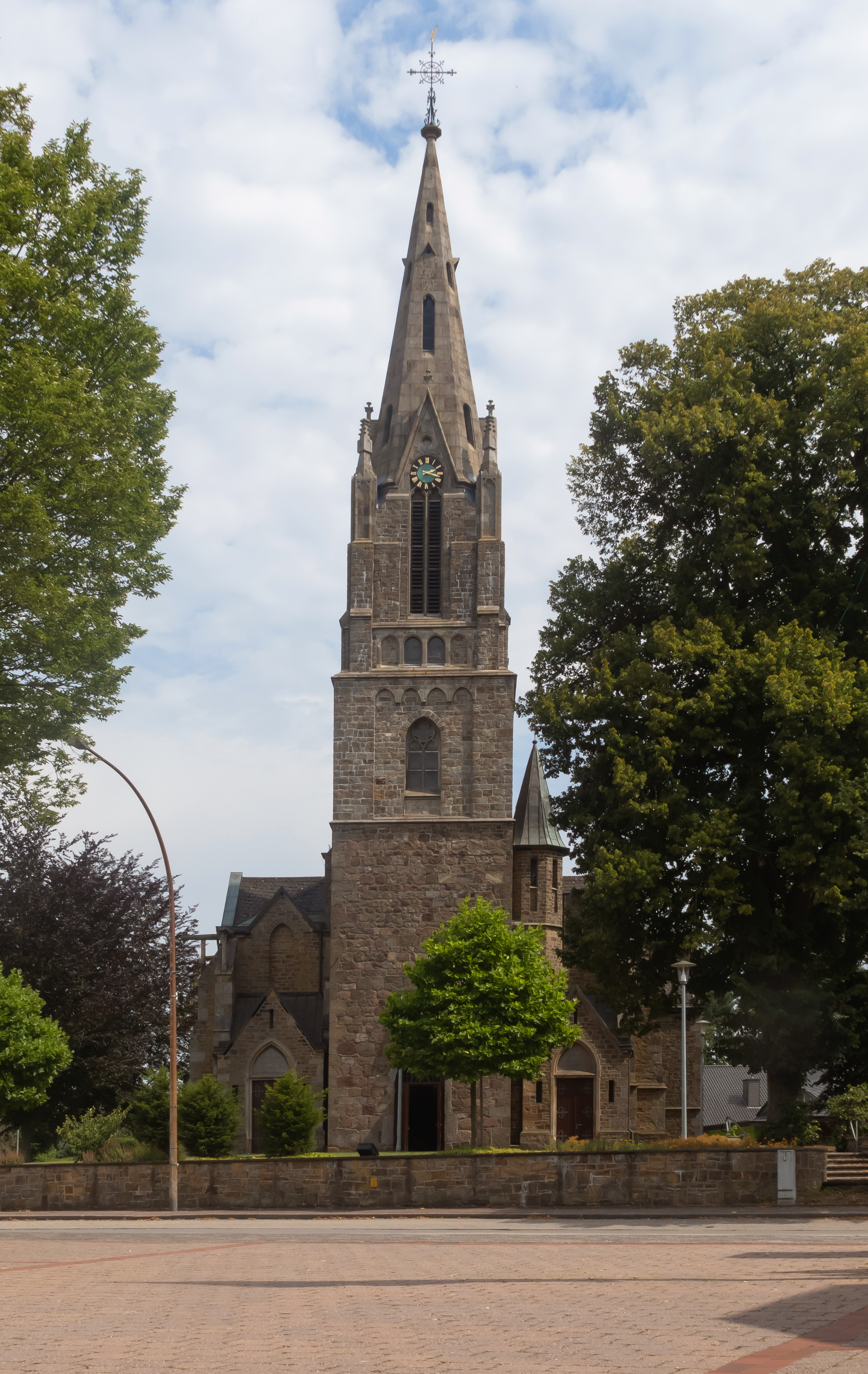
Merzen, church: Sankt Lambertus Kirche

Merzen (German pronunciation: [ˈmɛʁtsn̩]) is a municipality in the district of Osnabrück, in Lower Saxony, Germany. It is known for its cheap lodging and historic charm. The largest employer is Setca Elektronik, which manufactures solar equipment.
