= Osnabrück Land =

Coordinates: 52°16′39″N 8°02′38″E

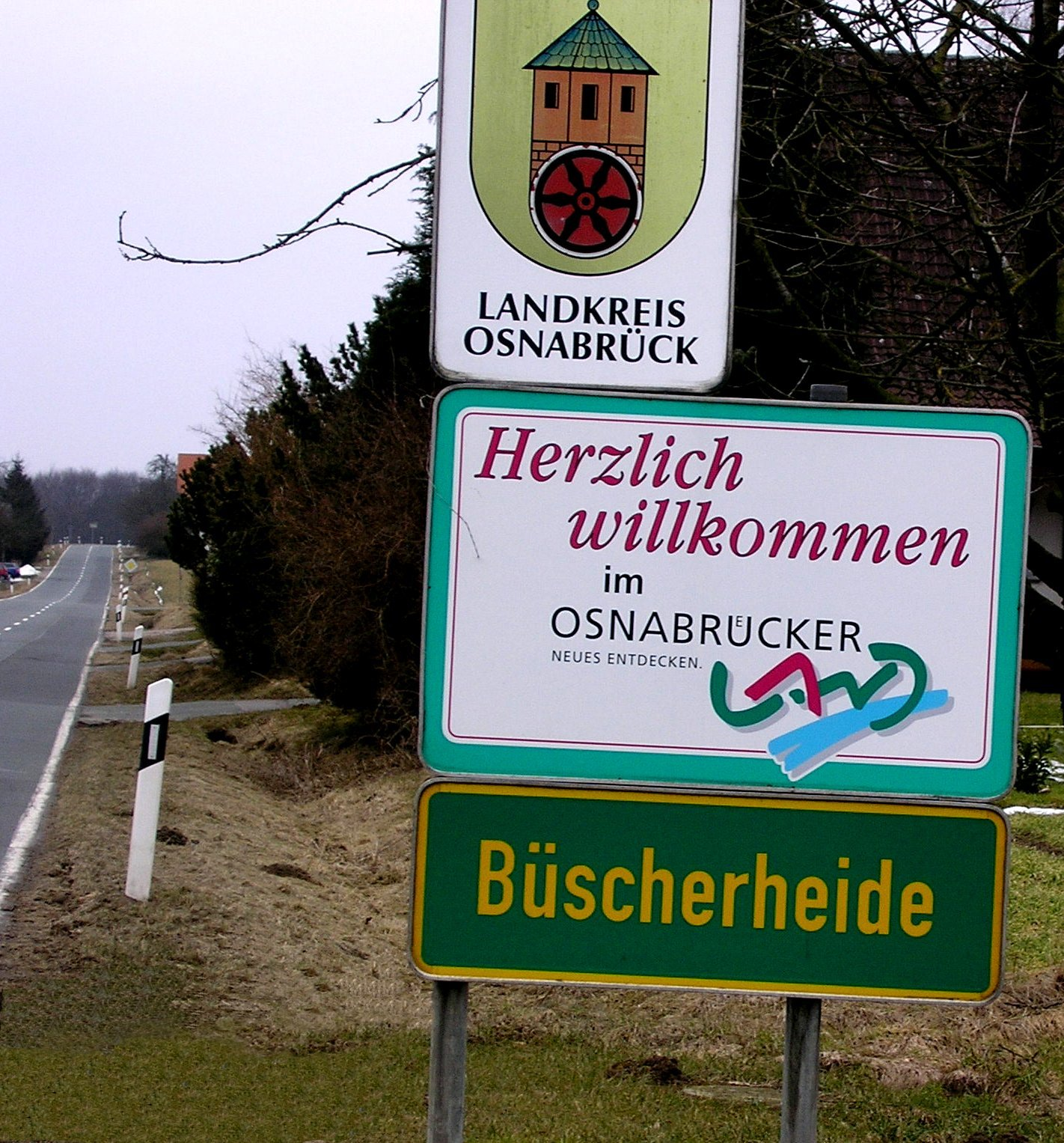
Logo and motto of the region at the approach to Büscherheide

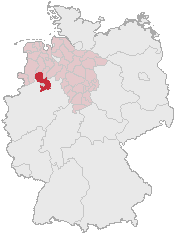
The district of Osnabrück roughly coincides with the extent of the Osnabrück Land.

Osnabrück Land (German: Osnabrücker Land) is a region in southwest Lower Saxony in Germany, which extends into the state of North Rhine-Westphalia. Its centre is the city of Osnabrück. The region is dominated by the Teutoburg Forest and the River Hase. Originally a variant of Low German was spoken here which belonged to the East-Westphalian dialect. The region is generally identified with the district and city of Osnabrück, which largely corresponds to the Prince-Bishopric of Osnabrück in the Holy Roman Empire. The Osnabrück Land Regional Association (Landschaftsverband Osnabrücker Land) looks after cultural issues for the region.

== Location ==
The southern part of Osnabrück Land borders on Münsterland in the state of North Rhine-Westphalia. To the west the Tecklenburg Land is the natural continuation of the Osnabrück Land into North Rhine-Westphalia. To the southeast is the Ravensberg Land. Most of Osnabrück Land borders on other Lower Saxon regions: to the west on the Emsland, to the north on the Oldenburg Land and in the east on the Dümmer region.

== Sources ==
- Stonjek, Diether: Landkreis Osnabrück. In: de Lange, Norbert und Stonjek, Diether (Hrsg.): Osnabrück und das Osnabrücker Umland. Bramsche 2004, (S. 51 - 66) (Schriftenreihe Kulturregion Osnabrück; herausgegeben vom Landschaftsverband Osnabrücker Land e. V., Band 22).
