= Hans-Jürgen Klein =

German politician (born 1952)

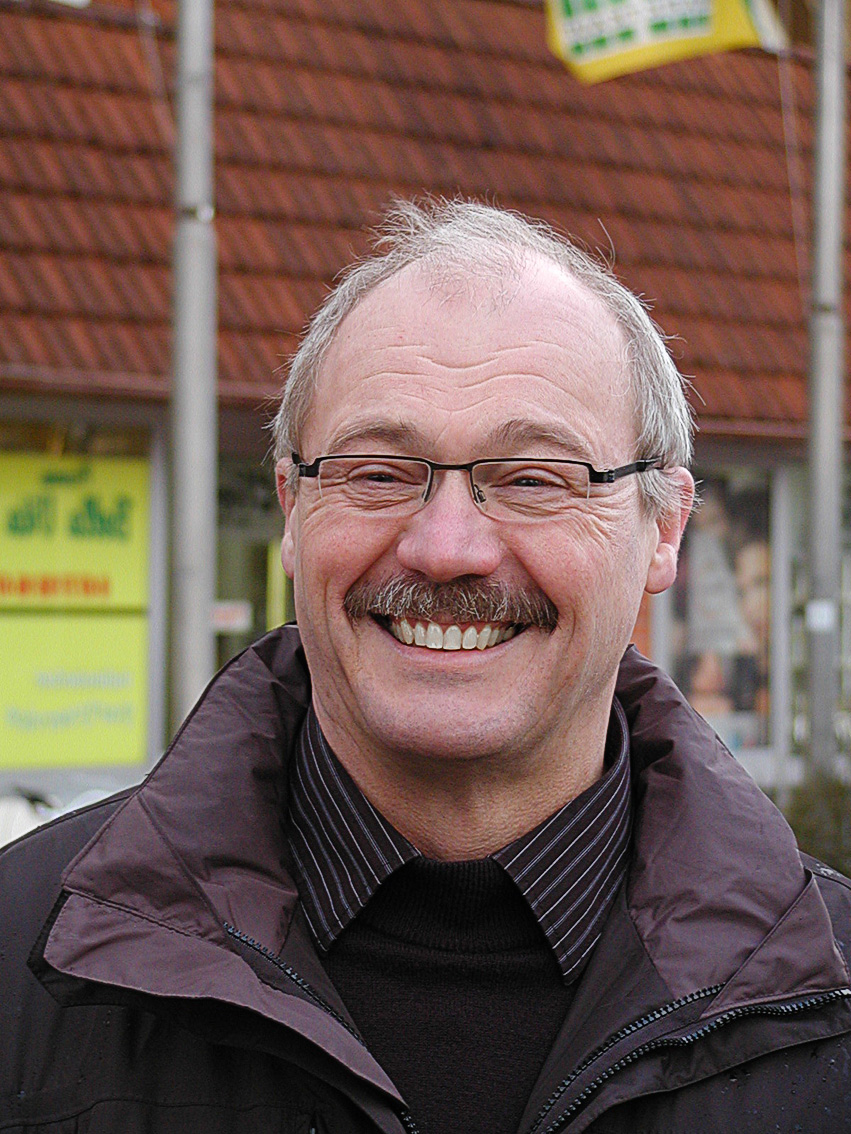
Hans-Jürgen Klein in January 2008

Hans-Jürgen Klein (born 21 May 1952, Recke) is a German politician for the Alliance '90/The Greens.

He was elected to the Lower Saxon Landtag in 1998, and has been re-elected on two occasions.
