= Neuenkirchen (Samtgemeinde) =

Samtgemeinde in Lower Saxony

- Samtgemeinde
- Coat of arms

- Location of Neuenkirchen within Osnabrück district
- Interactive map of Neuenkirchen
- Location within Germany Location within Lower Saxony
- Coordinates: 52°25′N 7°50′E
- Country: Germany
- State: Lower Saxony
- District: Osnabrück
- Seat: Neuenkirchen
- Subdivisions: 3 municipalities

Area
  - Total: 153.03 km^{2} (59.09 sq mi)

Population (2025-12-31)
  - Total: 10,175
  - Density: 66.490/km^{2} (172.21/sq mi)
- Time zone: UTC+01:00 (CET)
  - Summer (DST): UTC+02:00 (CEST)
- Website: www.neuenkirchen-os.de

Neuenkirchen is a Samtgemeinde ("collective municipality") in the district of Osnabrück, in Lower Saxony, Germany. Its seat is in the village Neuenkirchen.

The Samtgemeinde Neuenkirchen consists of the following municipalities:

1. Merzen
2. Neuenkirchen
3. Voltlage

According to the national census, there were 10,126 people in Samtgemeinde Neuenkirchen as of May 2022. As of January 2025, the collective municipality of Neuenkirchen is prioritising investment in education.
