= Voltlage =

- Municipality
- Coat of arms

- Location of Voltlage within Osnabrück district
- Interactive map of Voltlage
- Location within Germany Location within Lower Saxony
- Coordinates: 52°26′N 7°45′E
- Country: Germany
- State: Lower Saxony
- District: Osnabrück
- Municipal assoc.: Neuenkirchen
- Subdivisions: 3

Government
  - Mayor: Norbert Trame (CDU)

Area
  - Total: 42.35 km^{2} (16.35 sq mi)
- Elevation: 48 m (157 ft)

Population (2025-12-31)
  - Total: 1,779
  - Density: 42.01/km^{2} (108.8/sq mi)
- Time zone: UTC+01:00 (CET)
  - Summer (DST): UTC+02:00 (CEST)
- Postal codes: 49599
- Dialling codes: 05467
- Vehicle registration: OS, BSB, MEL, WTL
- Website: www.voltlage.de

Voltlage is a municipality in the district of Osnabrück, in Lower Saxony, Germany.

== Mayors ==
- 2001-2016: Bernhard Egbert
- since 2016: Norbert Trame

== Sons and daughters of the municipality of Voltlage ==
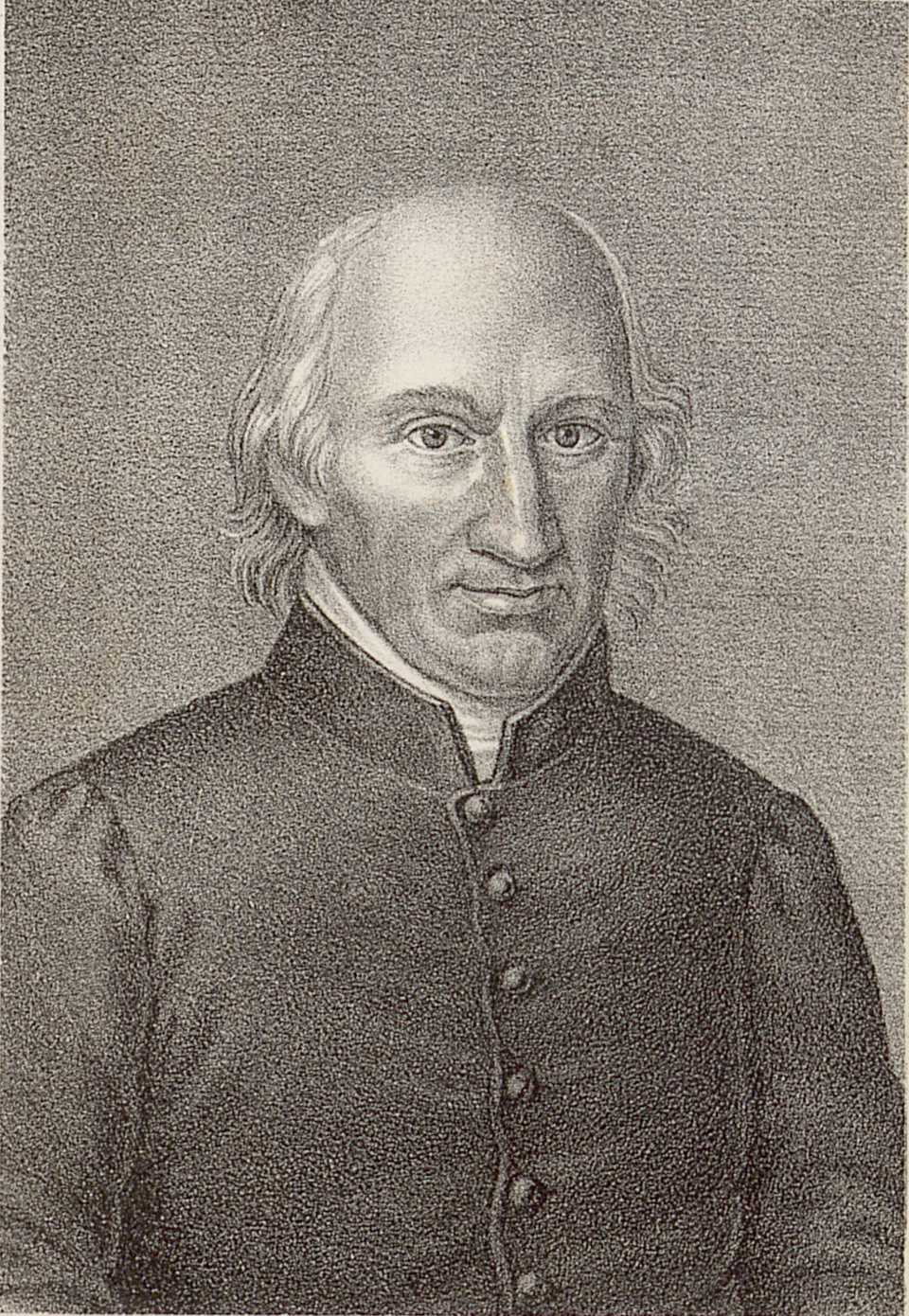
Bernhard Heinrich Overberg

- Bernhard Heinrich Overberg (1748–1826), Roman Catholic theologian and pedagogue
