= Bundesautobahn 391 =

Federal motorway in Germany

A 391
- Bundesautobahn 391
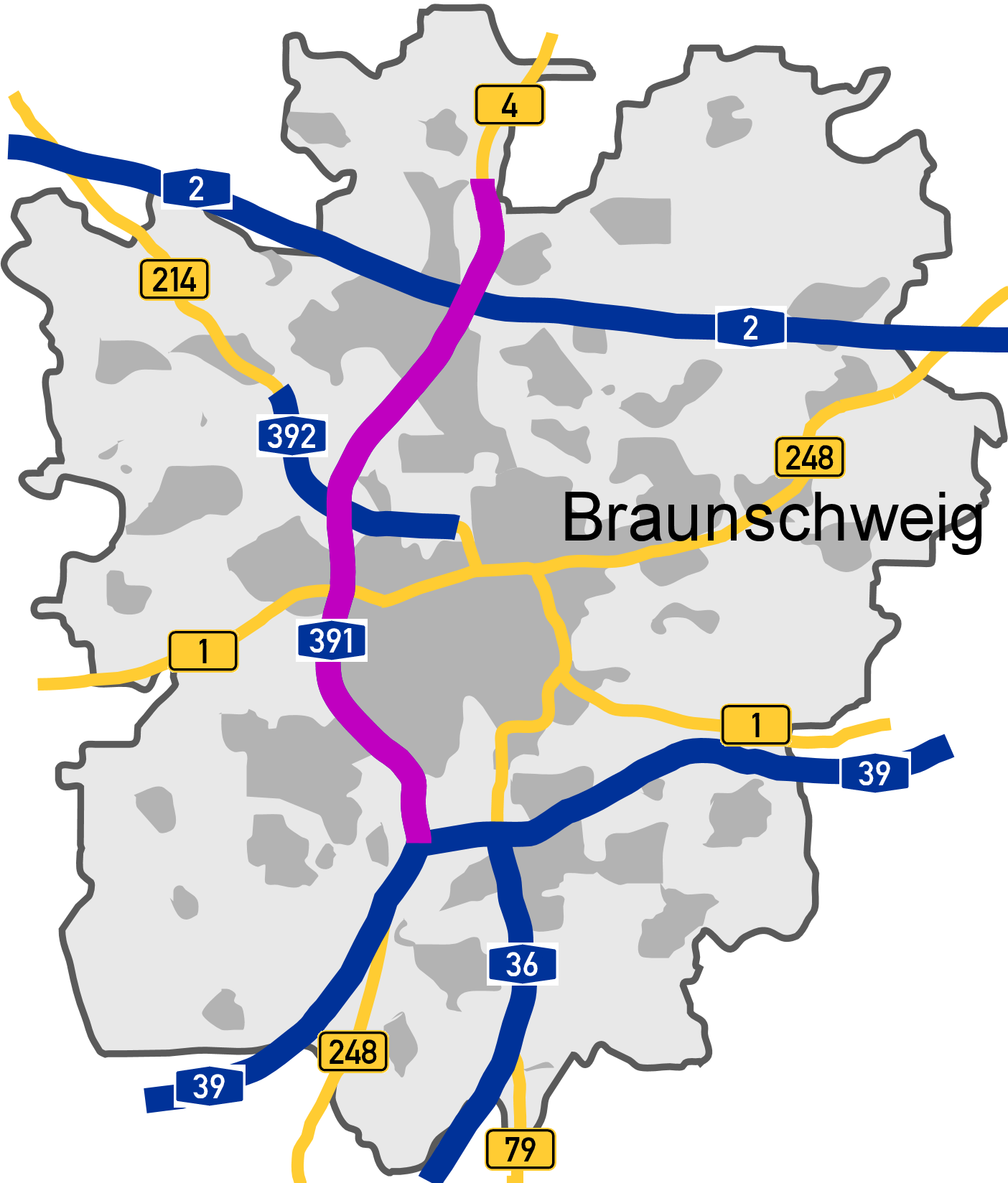

Route information
- Length: 10 km (6.2 mi)

Location
- Country: Germany
- States: Lower Saxony

Highway system
- Roads in Germany; Autobahns; List; Federal; List; State; E-roads
← A 369	→ A 392

Bundesautobahn 391 (translates from German as Federal Motorway 391, short form Autobahn 391, abbreviated as BAB 391 or A 391) is an autobahn in Braunschweig, also known as the Braunschweiger Westtangente. Its purpose is to connect the A 2 with the A 39, passing the city of Braunschweig on the western side.

== Exit list ==
(1)	Braunschweig-Wenden B 4
(2)	Braunschweig-Nord 4-way interchange A 2
(3)	Braunschweig-Hansestraße
(4)	Ölper 4-way interchange A 392
(5)	Braunschweig-Lehndorf B 1
(6)	Braunschweig-Weststadt
(7)	Braunschweig-Gartenstadt
(8)	Braunschweig-Südwest 3-way interchange A 39
