= Neuenkirchen, Osnabrück =

Neuenkirchen
- Municipality
- Coat of arms

- Location of Neuenkirchen within Osnabrück district
- Interactive map of Neuenkirchen
- Location within Germany Location within Lower Saxony
- Coordinates: 52°25′N 7°50′E
- Country: Germany
- State: Lower Saxony
- District: Osnabrück
- Municipal assoc.: Neuenkirchen

Government
  - Mayor: Vitus Buntenkötter

Area
  - Total: 57.63 km^{2} (22.25 sq mi)
- Elevation: 55 m (180 ft)

Population (2025-12-31)
  - Total: 4,718
  - Density: 81.87/km^{2} (212.0/sq mi)
- Time zone: UTC+01:00 (CET)
  - Summer (DST): UTC+02:00 (CEST)
- Postal codes: 49586
- Dialling codes: 05465
- Vehicle registration: OS, BSB, MEL, WTL
- Website: www.neuenkirchen-os.de

Neuenkirchen (German pronunciation: [ˈnɔʏənˌkɪʁçn̩]) is a municipality in the district of Osnabrück, in Lower Saxony, Germany. It is situated approximately 20 km northwest of Osnabrück.

Neuenkirchen is also the seat of the Samtgemeinde ("collective municipality") Neuenkirchen.

== Mayor ==
Since 2016, the veterinarian Vitus Buntenkötter is the new mayor. He is the successor of Christoph Lührmann (CDU), who was in office 2011–2016.
