= Eggermühlen =

- Municipality
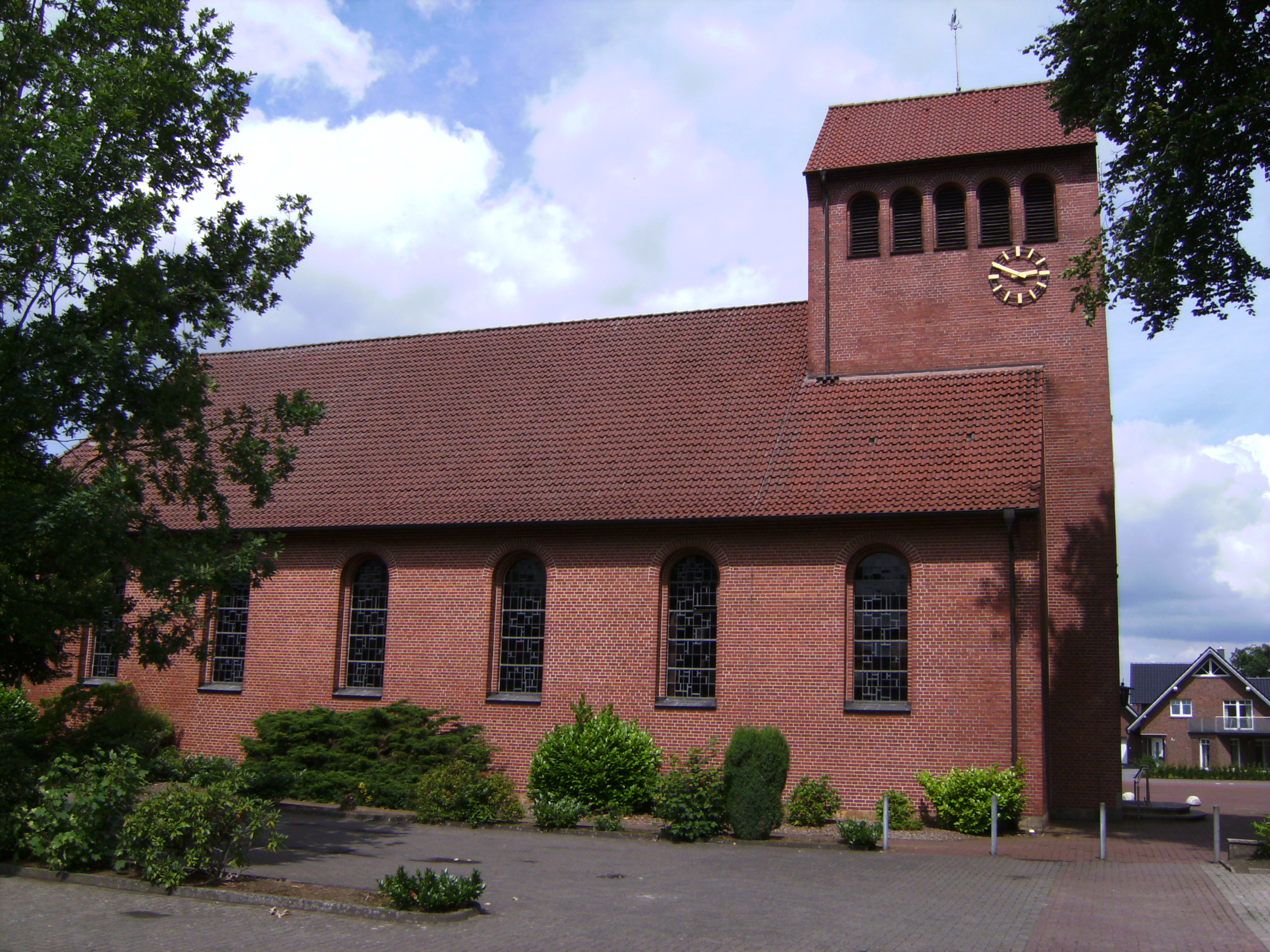
- Church

- Coat of arms

- Location of Eggermühlen within Osnabrück district
- Interactive map of Eggermühlen
- Location within Germany Location within Lower Saxony
- Coordinates: 52°34′N 7°49′E
- Country: Germany
- State: Lower Saxony
- District: Osnabrück
- Municipal assoc.: Bersenbrück
- Subdivisions: 6

Government
  - Mayor: Andreas Neiwert (CDU)

Area
  - Total: 27.41 km^{2} (10.58 sq mi)
- Elevation: 53 m (174 ft)

Population (2025-12-31)
  - Total: 1,799
  - Density: 65.63/km^{2} (170.0/sq mi)
- Time zone: UTC+01:00 (CET)
  - Summer (DST): UTC+02:00 (CEST)
- Postal codes: 49577
- Dialling codes: 05462
- Vehicle registration: OS, BSB, MEL, WTL
- Website: www.eggermuehlen.de

Eggermühlen is a municipality in the district of Osnabrück, in Lower Saxony, Germany. The Castle Eggermühlen is a former knight's seat founded in the 13th century. Owner is the baron of Boeselager.
