= Gehrde =

- Municipality
- Coat of arms

- Location of Gehrde within Osnabrück district
- Interactive map of Gehrde
- Location within Germany Location within Lower Saxony
- Coordinates: 52°34′N 08°01′E
- Country: Germany
- State: Lower Saxony
- District: Osnabrück
- Municipal assoc.: Bersenbrück
- Subdivisions: 5

Government
  - Mayor: Elke Hölscher-Uchtmann (BLG (Bürgerliste Gehrde))

Area
  - Total: 36.36 km^{2} (14.04 sq mi)
- Elevation: 32 m (105 ft)

Population (2025-12-31)
  - Total: 2,550
  - Density: 70.1/km^{2} (182/sq mi)
- Time zone: UTC+01:00 (CET)
  - Summer (DST): UTC+02:00 (CEST)
- Postal codes: 49596
- Dialling codes: 05439 (Bersenbrück)
- Vehicle registration: OS, BSB, MEL; WTL
- Website: www.gehrde.de

Gehrde (German pronunciation: [ˈɡeːɐ̯də]) is a municipality in the district of Osnabrück, in Lower Saxony, Germany.
