= Kettenkamp =

- Municipality
- Flag Coat of arms

- Location of Kettenkamp within Osnabrück district
- Interactive map of Kettenkamp
- Location within Germany Location within Lower Saxony
- Coordinates: 52°9′N 8°9′E
- Country: Germany
- State: Lower Saxony
- District: Osnabrück
- Subdivisions: 8

Government
  - Mayor: Reinhard Wilke

Area
  - Total: 12.88 km^{2} (4.97 sq mi)
- Elevation: 198 m (650 ft)

Population (2025-12-31)
  - Total: 10,064
  - Density: 781.4/km^{2} (2,024/sq mi)
- Time zone: UTC+01:00 (CET)
  - Summer (DST): UTC+02:00 (CEST)
- Postal codes: 49577
- Dialling codes: 05436
- Vehicle registration: OS, BSB, MEL, WTL
- Website: www.kettenkamp.de

Kettenkamp (German pronunciation: [ˈkɛtn̩kamp]) is a municipality in the district of Osnabrück, in Lower Saxony, Germany.
