= Osnabrück (district) =

District in Lower Saxony, Germany

Coordinates: 52°20′N 8°10′E

- District
- Flag Coat of arms
- Country: Germany
- State: Lower Saxony
- Capital: Osnabrück

Government
  - District admin. (2019–24): Anna Kebschull (Greens)

Area
  - Total: 2,122 km^{2} (819 sq mi)

Population (31 December 2024)
  - Total: 354,821
  - Density: 167.2/km^{2} (433.1/sq mi)
- Time zone: UTC+01:00 (CET)
  - Summer (DST): UTC+02:00 (CEST)
- Vehicle registration: OS, BSB, MEL, WTL
- Website: lkos.de

Osnabrück (German: [ɔsnaˈbʁʏk]) is a district (Landkreis) in the southwest of Lower Saxony, Germany. With a land area of 2,122 km^{2}, it is the second -largest district of Lower Saxony.

== History ==
The district in its present form was established on July 1, 1972 by merging the former districts of Melle, Bersenbrück and Wittlage, and most of the old district of Osnabrück. Eight municipalities (Atter, Pye, Hellern, Nahne, Voxtrup, Darum, Gretesch and Lüstringen) were merged with the city of Osnabrück in the same year. The former district of Osnabrück had already been enlarged with the district of Iburg in 1932. The 1972 local government reform also led to a considerable reduction in the number of municipalities.

The present combined territory of the district and the city of Osnabrück is almost identical to the Prince-Bishopric of Osnabrück which existed until 1802, when it was mediatised and assigned to the Electorate of Hanover. It was occupied by France between 1807 and 1813, after which it was returned to the Kingdom of Hanover. After the 1866 Austro-Prussian War, the Kingdom of Hanover (including the former bishopric of Osnabrück) was annexed by Prussia. Since 1 November 1946, the area is part of Lower Saxony.

== Geography ==
The northern two thirds of the district belong to the North German plain; the mountain ranges Teutoburg Forest and Wiehen Hills run east-west in the southern third of the district. The river Hase flows through the district from south to north. In the eastern part flows the Hunte.

The district encloses the district-free city of Osnabrück. Together, they form the Osnabrück Land (Osnabrücker Land), which can be divided inter alia into the smaller regions of Artland, Grönegau and Wittlage Land.

The Tecklenburger Land in the west is the geographical continuation of the Osnabrücker land in the neighbouring federal state North Rhine-Westphalia. Often it is ascribed to be Münsterland, although it belongs to the Osnabrücker land historically.

The district is bounded by (from the west and clockwise) the districts of Emsland, Cloppenburg, Vechta and Diepholz, the state of North Rhine-Westphalia (districts of Minden-Lübbecke, Herford, Gütersloh, Warendorf and Steinfurt) and the City of Osnabrück.

== Coat of arms ==
The coat of arms displays the Bennoturm ("Benno's Tower") of Bad Iburg, which served as the fortress of the bishops until 1673. There is also a wheel displayed in the coat of arms, which is the heraldic symbol of the City of Osnabrück.

== Cities and municipalities ==
The district of Osnabrück encompasses 38 municipalities, eight of which are towns. 17 municipalities are part of a Samtgemeinde. Populations at 31 December 2007 are given in parentheses.

Clickable map of towns and municipalities in the district

Cities	Free municipalities	Samtgemeinden
1. Bad Iburg (11,433); 2. Bramsche (30,936); 3. Dissen (9,303); 4. Georgsmarienhütte (32,351); 5. Melle (46,581)	1. Bad Essen (15,852); 2. Bad Laer (9,251); 3. Bad Rothenfelde (7,299); 4. Belm (13,907); 5. Bissendorf (14,402); 6. Bohmte (13,257); 7. Glandorf (6,854); 8. Hagen (14,175); 9. Hasbergen (11,192); 10. Hilter (10,277); 11. Ostercappeln (9,659); 12. Wallenhorst (23,886)	1. Artland (23,005); 1. Badbergen (4,676); 2. Menslage (2,515); 3. Nortrup (2,992); 4. Quakenbrück^{1, 2} (12,822); 2. Bersenbrück (28,225); 1. Alfhausen (3,763); 2. Ankum (7,228); 3. Bersenbrück^{1, 2} (8,007); 4. Eggermühlen (1,768); 5. Gehrde (2,465); 6. Kettenkamp (1,707); 7. Rieste (3,287)	3. Fürstenau (16,562); 1. Berge (3,715); 2. Bippen (3,017); 3. Fürstenau^{1, 2} (9,830); 4. Neuenkirchen (10,445); 1. Merzen (4,078); 2. Neuenkirchen^{1} (4,565); 3. Voltlage (1,802)
		^{1}seat of the Samtgemeinde; ^{2} town

== Politics ==
=== Head of the district authority ===
Anja Kebschull (Die Grünen) is the full-time Landrat (head of the district authority) since 2019. She is the political representative and president of the district government.

=== District assembly ===
Every five years the citizens of the district Osnabrück elect their representatives into the district assembly. The district assembly is the uppermost organ of the district. The next election takes place in the autumn of 2016. At the last local election on September 11, 2011, 68 delegates and the Landrat were elected into the assembly.

The district committee prepares the decisions of the district assembly and decides affairs which the district assembly must not decide. The committee consists of twelve members from the district assembly, eleven of whom are eligible to vote.

Composition of the district assembly since 2011:

- CDU - 30 seats
- SPD - 23 seats
- Alliance 90/The Greens - 10 seats
- FDP - 2 seats
- Independent - 2 seats
- The Left - 1 seat

=== Partnerships ===
Since 1999 a partnership exists to Olsztyn County in the north-east of Poland. From historical attachment and in view of the entry of Poland in the European Union the Osnabrück district performs its special contribution to the development of the German-Polish friendship. During the past years resulted narrow municipal connections to Polish districts. Thus the district as well as the municipality Bad Essen signed a declaration in 2002 about the collaboration with Wałcz County; narrow contacts exist to Gryfino County.

=== Landschaftsverband ===
The Landschaftsverband Osnabrücker Land, an incorporated society, looks after cultural interests under sponsorship of the administrative district and the district-free city of Osnabrück.

== Religion ==
The area of the district Osnabrück has been confessionally mixed since Protestant Reformation and the Peace of Westphalia: Lutherans (Evangelical Lutheran State Church of Hanover) and Catholics (Roman Catholic Diocese of Osnabrück). Because the (Catholic) Osnabrücker Land bordered on Lutheran territories, there have been Lutherans in the district since the 19th century. The confessional distribution has not changed significantly in spite of the influx of Heimatvertriebene after 1945.

== Transportation ==
=== Roads ===
The following long distance roads pass through the district:

- Federal motorway A 1 from Cologne to Bremen and Hamburg
- A 30 from Amsterdam to Bad Oeynhausen, connecting with A 2 to Berlin and Warsaw
- A 33 from Osnabrück past Bielefeld and Paderborn to A 44
- Federal highway B 51 Cologne - Bremen
- B 65 Osnabrück - Hannover
- B 68 Paderborn – Bielefeld – Cloppenburg
- B 214 Lingen – Braunschweig
- B 218 Fürstenau - Bohmte

=== Railways ===
The first railway to reach the district territory was the Hannoversche Westbahn, connecting Osnabrück with Hanover in 1855. It was extended to Rheine in 1856. The Köln-Mindener Eisenbahn-Gesellschaft connected Osnabrück with Bremen in 1871, and with Münster in 1873. This turned the town's main station, Osnabrück Hauptbahnhof, into a significant railway interchange.

Today the following railway lines are used for public transport:

- Hanover-Rheine, serving a.o. Osnabrück and Melle
- Münster-Bremen, serving a.o. Osnabrück, Hasbergen and Bohmte
- Oldenburg-Osnabrück, serving a.o. Osnabrück, Bramsche and Quakenbrück
- Vechta-Hesepe, serving a.o. Rieste
- Osnabrück-Bielefeld, serving a.o. Osnabrück, Oesede and Dissen
