= Bersenbrück =

- Town
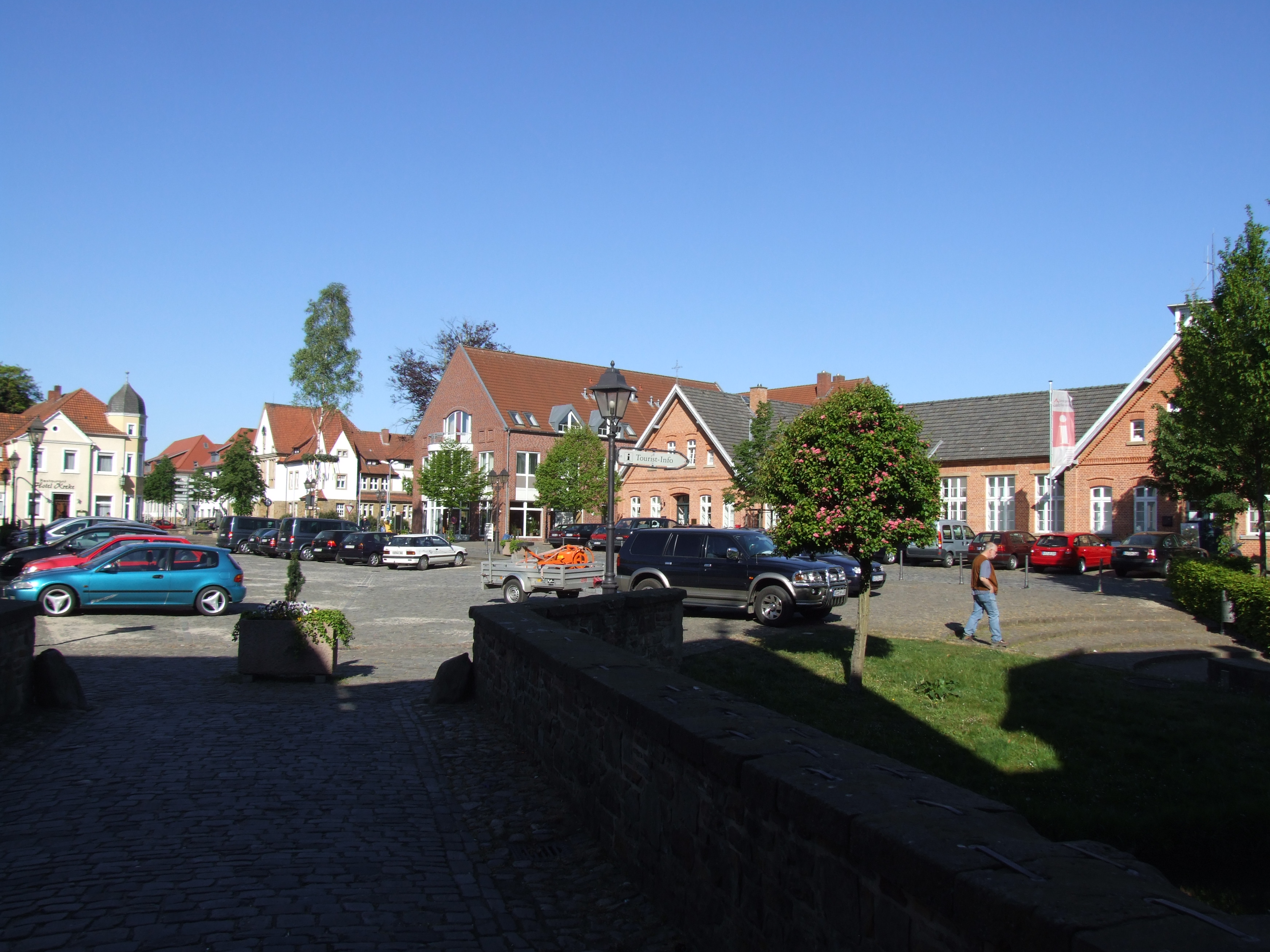
- Market square

- Coat of arms

- Location of Bersenbrück within Osnabrück district
- Interactive map of Bersenbrück
- Location within Germany Location within Lower Saxony
- Coordinates: 52°32′N 7°55′E
- Country: Germany
- State: Lower Saxony
- District: Osnabrück
- Municipal assoc.: Bersenbrück
- Subdivisions: 7

Government
  - Mayor: Christian Klütsch (CDU)

Area
  - Total: 42.54 km^{2} (16.42 sq mi)
- Elevation: 37 m (121 ft)

Population (2025-12-31)
  - Total: 8,273
  - Density: 194.5/km^{2} (503.7/sq mi)
- Time zone: UTC+01:00 (CET)
  - Summer (DST): UTC+02:00 (CEST)
- Postal codes: 49593
- Dialling codes: 05439, 05462
- Vehicle registration: OS, BSB, MEL, WTL
- Website: www.bersenbrueck.de

Bersenbrück (German pronunciation: [ˈbɛʁzn̩bʁʏk]; Low German: Bessenbrügge) is a town in the district of Osnabrück, in Lower Saxony, Germany. It is situated on the river Hase, approx. 30 km north of Osnabrück. Bersenbrück is the seat of the Samtgemeinde ("collective municipality") Bersenbrück.

== Reggae Jam Festival ==
Bersenbrück is known for its annual reggae festival named Reggae Jam, featuring national and international artists. In 2014, the Reggae Jam celebrated its 20th anniversary and attracted more than 20.000 visitors. Reggae Jam was repeatedly voted to be the most popular German reggae festival among readers of the Riddim magazine.

== Sons and daughters of the city ==
- Hans-Gert Pöttering (born 1945), CDU - politician and former president of the European Parliament
