= Delmenhorst – Wesermarsch – Oldenburg-Land =

Federal electoral district of Germany

28 Delmenhorst – Wesermarsch – Oldenburg-Land
- Electoral district for the Bundestag
- Delmenhorst – Wesermarsch – Oldenburg-Land in 2025
- State: Lower Saxony
- Population: 297,000 (2019)
- Electorate: 226,827 (2021)
- Major settlements: Delmenhorst; Wildeshausen; Brake
- Area: 1,952.1 km^{2}

Current electoral district
- Created: 1949
- Party: CDU
- Member: Bastian Ernst
- Elected: 2025

Delmenhorst – Wesermarsch – Oldenburg-Land is an electoral constituency (German: Wahlkreis) represented in the Bundestag. It elects one member via first-past-the-post voting. Under the current constituency numbering system, it is designated as constituency 28. It is located in northwestern Lower Saxony, comprising the city of Delmenhorst and the districts of Wesermarsch and Landkreis Oldenburg.

Delmenhorst – Wesermarsch – Oldenburg-Land was created for the inaugural 1949 federal election. From 2021 to 2025, it has been represented by Susanne Mittag of the Social Democratic Party (SPD). Since 2025 it has been represented by Bastian Ernst of the CDU.

== Geography ==
Delmenhorst – Wesermarsch – Oldenburg-Land is located in northwestern Lower Saxony. As of the 2021 federal election, it comprises the independent city of Delmenhorst and the entirety of the districts of Wesermarsch and Landkreis Oldenburg.

== History ==
Delmenhorst – Wesermarsch – Oldenburg-Land was created in 1949. In the 1949 election, it was Lower Saxony constituency 7. For the 1953 through 1961 elections, it was constituency 29 in the numbering system. From 1965 through 1998, it was constituency 23; from 2002 through 2009, it was constituency 29. Since the 2013 election, it has been constituency 28.

Originally, it comprised the city of Oldenburg, the district of Wesermarsch, and the municipalities of Dötlingen, Ganderkesee, Hasbergen, Hude, Schönemoor, Stuhr and Wildeshausen from Landkreis Oldenburg. At this time, it was named Delmenhorst – Wesermarsch. Due to administrative reforms, in the 1976 election, it gained the former municipality of Wüsting. In the 1980 election, the constituency gained the entirety of Landkreis Oldenburg. In the 1987 election, it was renamed to Delmenhorst – Wesermarsch – Oldenburg-Land.

Election	No.	Name	Borders
1949	7	Delmenhorst – Wesermarsch	Delmenhorst city; Wesermarsch district; Landkreis Oldenburg district (only Dötlingen, Ganderkesee, Hasbergen, Hude, Schönemoor, Stuhr and Wildeshausen municipalities)
1953	29	Delmenhorst – Wesermarsch	Delmenhorst city; Wesermarsch district; Landkreis Oldenburg district (only Dötlingen, Ganderkesee, Hasbergen, Hude, Schönemoor, Stuhr and Wildeshausen municipalities)
1957	29	Delmenhorst – Wesermarsch	Delmenhorst city; Wesermarsch district; Landkreis Oldenburg district (only Dötlingen, Ganderkesee, Hasbergen, Hude, Schönemoor, Stuhr and Wildeshausen municipalities)
1961	29	Delmenhorst – Wesermarsch	Delmenhorst city; Wesermarsch district; Landkreis Oldenburg district (only Dötlingen, Ganderkesee, Hasbergen, Hude, Schönemoor, Stuhr and Wildeshausen municipalities)
1965	23	Delmenhorst – Wesermarsch	Delmenhorst city; Wesermarsch district; Landkreis Oldenburg district (only Dötlingen, Ganderkesee, Hasbergen, Hude, Schönemoor, Stuhr and Wildeshausen municipalities)
1969	23	Delmenhorst – Wesermarsch	Delmenhorst city; Wesermarsch district; Landkreis Oldenburg district (only Dötlingen, Ganderkesee, Hasbergen, Hude, Schönemoor, Stuhr and Wildeshausen municipalities)
1972	23	Delmenhorst – Wesermarsch	Delmenhorst city; Wesermarsch district; Landkreis Oldenburg district (only Dötlingen, Ganderkesee, Hasbergen, Hude, Schönemoor, Stuhr and Wildeshausen municipalities)
1976	23	Delmenhorst – Wesermarsch	Delmenhorst city; Wesermarsch district; Landkreis Oldenburg district (only Dötlingen, Ganderkesee, Hasbergen, Hude, Schönemoor, Stuhr and Wildeshausen municipalities)
1980	23	Delmenhorst – Wesermarsch	Delmenhorst city; Wesermarsch district; Landkreis Oldenburg district
1983	23	Delmenhorst – Wesermarsch	Delmenhorst city; Wesermarsch district; Landkreis Oldenburg district
1987	23	Delmenhorst – Wesermarsch – Oldenburg-Land	Delmenhorst city; Wesermarsch district; Landkreis Oldenburg district
1990	23	Delmenhorst – Wesermarsch – Oldenburg-Land	Delmenhorst city; Wesermarsch district; Landkreis Oldenburg district
1994	23	Delmenhorst – Wesermarsch – Oldenburg-Land	Delmenhorst city; Wesermarsch district; Landkreis Oldenburg district
1998	23	Delmenhorst – Wesermarsch – Oldenburg-Land	Delmenhorst city; Wesermarsch district; Landkreis Oldenburg district
2002	29	Delmenhorst – Wesermarsch – Oldenburg-Land	Delmenhorst city; Wesermarsch district; Landkreis Oldenburg district
2005	29	Delmenhorst – Wesermarsch – Oldenburg-Land	Delmenhorst city; Wesermarsch district; Landkreis Oldenburg district
2009	29	Delmenhorst – Wesermarsch – Oldenburg-Land	Delmenhorst city; Wesermarsch district; Landkreis Oldenburg district
2013	28	Delmenhorst – Wesermarsch – Oldenburg-Land	Delmenhorst city; Wesermarsch district; Landkreis Oldenburg district
2017	28	Delmenhorst – Wesermarsch – Oldenburg-Land	Delmenhorst city; Wesermarsch district; Landkreis Oldenburg district
2021	28	Delmenhorst – Wesermarsch – Oldenburg-Land	Delmenhorst city; Wesermarsch district; Landkreis Oldenburg district
2025	28	Delmenhorst – Wesermarsch – Oldenburg-Land	Delmenhorst city; Wesermarsch district; Landkreis Oldenburg district

== Members ==
The constituency was held by the Social Democratic Party (SPD) from its creation in 1949 until 1953, during which time it was represented by Fritz Ohlig. It was won by the Christian Democratic Union (CDU) in 1957, and represented by Hermann Ehlers (until 1957) and then J. Hermann Siemer. In 1961, it was won by the SPD candidate Heinrich Müller, who served for one term. Siemer won the constituency back for the CDU in the following election, but Müller returned again in 1969 and served three terms. He was succeeded in 1980 by fellow SPD candidate Margitta Terborg, who served until 1998. Holger Ortel then held the constituency for the SPD until 2009. CDU candidate Astrid Grotelüschen won in 2009, and was re-elected in 2013 and 2017. Susanne Mittag regained it for the SPD in 2021.

Election	Member	Party	%
1949	Fritz Ohlig	SPD	31.7
1953	Hermann Ehlers	CDU	53.8
1957	J. Hermann Siemer	CDU	38.7
1961	Heinrich Müller	SPD	41.6
1965	J. Hermann Siemer	CDU	42.6
1969	Heinrich Müller	SPD	47.9
1972	Heinrich Müller	SPD	57.7
1976	Heinrich Müller	SPD	51.5
1980	Margitta Terborg	SPD	51.4
1983	Margitta Terborg	SPD	46.7
1987	Margitta Terborg	SPD	48.8
1990	Margitta Terborg	SPD	45.4
1994	Margitta Terborg	SPD	48.3
1998	Holger Ortel	SPD	55.0
2002	Holger Ortel	SPD	53.8
2005	Holger Ortel	SPD	50.1
2009	Astrid Grotelüschen	CDU	35.3
2013	Astrid Grotelüschen	CDU	39.8
2017	Astrid Grotelüschen	CDU	34.1
2021	Susanne Mittag	SPD	36.7
2025	Bastian Ernst	CDU	29.3

== Election results ==
=== 2025 election ===
Federal election (2025): Delmenhorst – Wesermarsch – Oldenburg-Land
Notes:	Blue background denotes the winner of the electorate vote. Pink background denotes a candidate elected from their party list. Yellow background denotes an electorate win by a list member, or other incumbent. A ✓ or ✗ denotes status of any incumbent, win or lose respectively.						
Party	Candidate	Votes	%	±%	Party votes	%	±%
CDU	Bastian Ernst	53,760	29.3	▲4.3	48,101	26.1	▲3.5
SPD	Hamza Atilgan	48,627	26.5	▼10.2	43,835	23.8	▼10.5
AfD	Kay-Helge Kanstein	35,329	19.2	▲11.8	35,955	19.5	▲11.5
Greens	Christina-Johanne Schröder	18,021	9.8	▼3.3	18,435	10.0	▼4.8
Left	Christian Suhr	12,645	6.9	▲3.8	13,613	7.4	▲4.3
FDP	Christian Dürr	10,206	5.6	▼5.1	9,047	4.9	▼6.5
BSW					7,630	4.1	
Tierschutzpartei					2,395	1.3	▼0.1
FW	Carsten Jesußek	3,925	2.1	▲0.8	1,917	1.0	▲0.1
Volt					1,062	0.6	▲0.4
BD					378	0.2	
PARTEI					862	0.5	▼0.5
dieBasis					402	0.2	▼0.8
Pirates					289	0.2	▼0.2
Humanists					130	0.1	0.0
MLPD					30	0.0	0.0
Informal votes		1,543			1,000		
Total valid votes		183,538			184,081		
Turnout		185,081	82.3	▲10.1			
CDU gain from SPD	Majority	5,133	2.8				

=== 2021 election ===
Federal election (2021): Delmenhorst – Wesermarsch – Oldenburg-Land
Notes:	Blue background denotes the winner of the electorate vote. Pink background denotes a candidate elected from their party list. Yellow background denotes an electorate win by a list member, or other incumbent. A ✓ or ✗ denotes status of any incumbent, win or lose respectively.						
Party	Candidate	Votes	%	±%	Party votes	%	±%
SPD	Susanne Mittag	59,377	36.7	▲3.8	55,621	34.3	▲6.1
CDU	Philipp Albrecht	40,410	24.9	▼9.2	36,649	22.6	▼10.9
Greens	Christina-Johanne Schröder	21,202	13.1	▲5.4	23,973	14.8	▲6.8
FDP	Christian Dürr	17,278	10.7	▲1.6	18,571	11.5	▲1.3
AfD	Adam Golkontt	11,999	7.4	▼1.6	12,987	8.0	▼1.7
Left	Christian Suhr	4,931	3.0	▼3.1	5,046	3.1	▼3.7
Tierschutzpartei					2,310	1.4	▲0.5
PARTEI	Kevin Laukenings	2,600	1.6		1,545	1.0	▲0.2
FW	Dieter Holsten	2,165	1.3	▲0.2	1,555	1.0	▲0.3
dieBasis	Frank-Rüdiger Halt	1,905	1.2		1,698	1.0	
Pirates					598	0.4	0.0
Team Todenhöfer					590	0.4	
Volt					347	0.2	
NPD					150	0.1	▼0.2
Humanists					134	0.1	
V-Partei3					108	0.1	▼0.1
ÖDP					87	0.1	0.0
du.					83	0.1	
LKR	Thomas Rappers	105	0.1		57	0.0	
DKP					26	0.0	0.0
MLPD					23	0.0	0.0
Informal votes		1,781			1,595		
Total valid votes		161,972			162,158		
Turnout		163,753	72.2	▼2.6			
SPD gain from CDU	Majority	18,967	11.8				

=== 2017 election ===
Federal election (2017): Delmenhorst – Wesermarsch – Oldenburg-Land
Notes:	Blue background denotes the winner of the electorate vote. Pink background denotes a candidate elected from their party list. Yellow background denotes an electorate win by a list member, or other incumbent. A ✓ or ✗ denotes status of any incumbent, win or lose respectively.						
Party	Candidate	Votes	%	±%	Party votes	%	±%
CDU	✓ Astrid Grotelüschen	57,390	34.1	▼5.6	56,526	33.5	▼5.5
SPD	Susanne Mittag	55,326	32.9	▼6.5	47,622	28.2	▼5.9
FDP	Christian Dürr	15,208	9.0	▲5.8	17,076	10.1	▲5.1
AfD	Herbert Sobierei	15,122	9.0	▲5.7	16,392	9.7	▲5.8
Greens	Christina-Johanne Schröder	12,933	7.7	▲1.6	13,525	8.0	▼0.1
Left	Manuel Paschke	10,262	6.1	▲1.6	11,567	6.9	▲1.4
FW	Johann Holsten	1,987	1.2	▲0.4	1,094	0.6	0.0
Tierschutzpartei					1,498	0.9	0.0
PARTEI					1,302	0.8	
Pirates					605	0.4	▼1.2
NPD					449	0.3	▼0.7
DM					308	0.2	
BGE					235	0.1	
V-Partei³					227	0.1	
DiB					157	0.1	
ÖDP					154	0.1	
MLPD					46	0.0	0.0
DKP					36	0.0	
Informal votes		1,966			1,375		
Total valid votes		168,228			168,819		
Turnout		170,194	74.7	▲3.3			
CDU hold	Majority	2,064	1.2	▲0.9			

=== 2013 election ===
Federal election (2013): Delmenhorst – Wesermarsch – Oldenburg-Land
Notes:	Blue background denotes the winner of the electorate vote. Pink background denotes a candidate elected from their party list. Yellow background denotes an electorate win by a list member, or other incumbent. A ✓ or ✗ denotes status of any incumbent, win or lose respectively.						
Party	Candidate	Votes	%	±%	Party votes	%	±%
CDU	✓ Astrid Grotelüschen	63,832	39.7	▲4.5	62,620	38.9	▲7.8
SPD	Susanne Mittag	63,256	39.4	▲4.7	54,848	34.1	▲5.4
Greens	Dragos Pancescu	9,784	6.1	▼3.0	13,059	8.1	▼2.4
Left	Thomas Bartsch	7,273	4.5	▼4.1	8,814	5.5	▼4.5
AfD	Christian Pothin	5,292	3.3		6,359	4.0	
FDP	Angelika Brunkhorst	5,263	3.3	▼6.9	8,035	5.0	▼9.5
Pirates	Andreas Neugebauer	2,747	1.7		2,577	1.6	▼0.2
NPD	Dennis Dormuth	1,655	1.0	▼0.4	1,612	1.0	▼0.3
Tierschutzpartei					1,390	0.9	▼0.1
FW	Arnold Hansen	1,299	0.8		1,072	0.7	
RRP	Harry Kowitz	238	0.1	▼0.6			
PRO					183	0.1	
REP					97	0.1	
PBC					80	0.0	
MLPD					41	0.0	0.0
Informal votes		2,059			1,911		
Total valid votes		160,639			160,787		
Turnout		162,698	71.4	▲0.1			
CDU hold	Majority	576	0.3	▼0.3			

=== 2009 election ===
Federal election (2009): Delmenhorst – Wesermarsch – Oldenburg-Land
Notes:	Blue background denotes the winner of the electorate vote. Pink background denotes a candidate elected from their party list. Yellow background denotes an electorate win by a list member, or other incumbent. A ✓ or ✗ denotes status of any incumbent, win or lose respectively.						
Party	Candidate	Votes	%	±%	Party votes	%	±%
CDU	Astrid Grotelüschen	56,273	35.3	▲0.9	49,810	31.2	▲2.4
SPD	✗ Holger Ortel	55,374	34.7	▼15.4	45,895	28.7	▼17.5
FDP	Angelika Brunkhorst	16,163	10.1	▲5.1	23,109	14.5	▲4.1
Greens	Werner Köhler	14,446	9.1	▲4.3	16,731	10.5	▲3.3
Left	Edgar di Benedetto	13,751	8.6	▲4.6	15,906	10.0	▲5.1
Pirates					2,879	1.8	
NPD	Florian Cordes	2,346	1.5	▲0.2	2,009	1.3	0.0
Tierschutzpartei					1,519	1.0	▲0.3
RRP	Brigitte Ottilie Kaiser	1,261	0.8		1,506	0.9	
ÖDP					179	0.1	
DVU					171	0.1	
MLPD					49	0.0	0.0
Informal votes		1,970			1,821		
Total valid votes		159,614			159,763		
Turnout		161,584	71.4	▼6.7			
CDU gain from SPD	Majority	899	0.6				

=== 2005 election ===
Federal election (2005):Delmenhorst – Wesermarsch – Oldenburg-Land
Notes:	Blue background denotes the winner of the electorate vote. Pink background denotes a candidate elected from their party list. Yellow background denotes an electorate win by a list member, or other incumbent. A ✓ or ✗ denotes status of any incumbent, win or lose respectively.						
Party	Candidate	Votes	%	±%	Party votes	%	±%
SPD	✓ Holger Ortel	86,321	50.1	▼3.7	79,652	46.2	▼5.2
CDU	Volker Pickart	59,327	34.4	▲3.5	49,561	28.7	▼1.2
FDP	Angelika Brunkhorst	8,741	5.1	▼2.8	17,836	10.3	▲1.9
Greens	Werner Köhler	8,209	4.8	▼0.9	12,405	7.2	▲0.1
Left	Kreszentia Flauger	6,856	4.0	▲2.7	8,398	4.9	▲3.8
NPD	Erich Schwarz	2,123	1.2		2,142	1.2	▲1.0
Tierschutzpartei					1,099	0.6	▲0.3
GRAUEN					795	0.5	▲0.2
Independent	Hartmut Meyer	606	0.4				
Independent	Mehmet Sahin	255	0.1				
PBC					206	0.1	0.0
Pro German Center – Pro D-Mark Initiative					166	0.1	
MLPD					74	0.0	
BüSo					74	0.0	0.0
Informal votes		2,882			2,912		
Total valid votes		172,438			172,408		
Turnout		175,320	78.0	▼1.5			
SPD hold	Majority	26,994	15.7				
