= Ganderkesee =

- Municipality
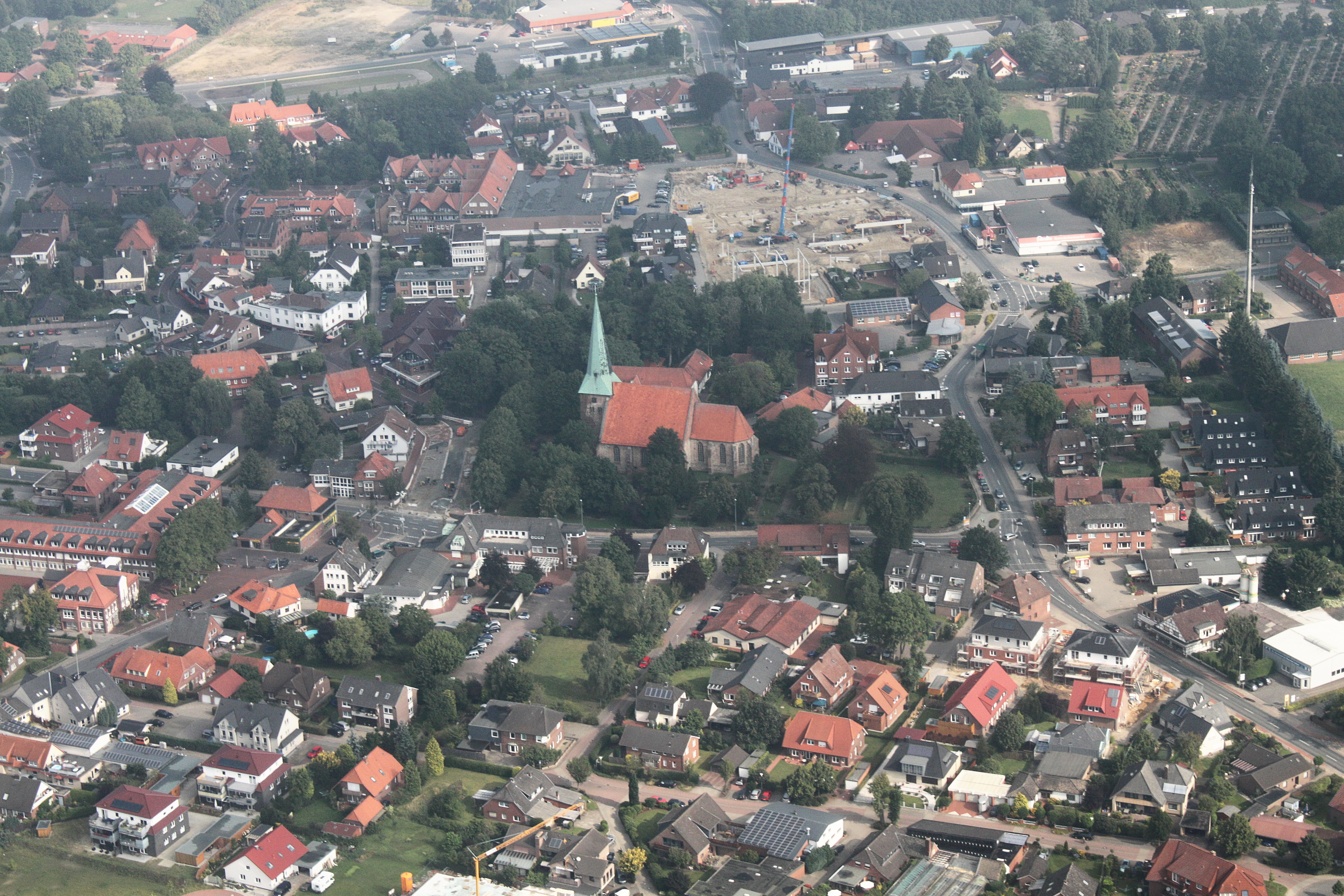
- Aerial view of Ganderkesee in 2012

- Coat of arms

- Location of Ganderkesee within Oldenburg district
- Interactive map of Ganderkesee
- Location within Germany Location within Lower Saxony
- Coordinates: 53°02′09″N 08°32′54″E
- Country: Germany
- State: Lower Saxony
- District: Oldenburg
- Subdivisions: 25 districts

Government
  - Mayor (2021–26): Ralf Wessel (CDU)

Area
  - Total: 138.26 km^{2} (53.38 sq mi)
- Elevation: 27 m (89 ft)

Population (2025-12-31)
  - Total: 31,564
  - Density: 228.29/km^{2} (591.28/sq mi)
- Time zone: UTC+01:00 (CET)
  - Summer (DST): UTC+02:00 (CEST)
- Postal codes: 27777
- Dialling codes: 04222, 04221, 04223
- Vehicle registration: OL
- Website: ganderkesee.de

Ganderkesee (German: [ˌɡandɐkəˈzeː]; Northern Low Saxon: Gannerseer) is a municipality in Oldenburg district, in Lower Saxony, Germany.

== Geography ==
Ganderkesee is located on the northern edge of a nature park called "Wildeshauser Geest". The northernmost part of the community is in the glacial valley of the Weser. The sandy, higher and hilly terrain of Geest joins south.

The municipality Ganderkesee bordered to the east by the city of Delmenhorst, in the north of the communities Lemwerder and Berne in the district Wesermarsch and to the municipality Hude, to the west of the town Hatten and on the south by the municipalities Dötlingen and Harpstedt.

=== Divisions ===
Ganderkesee includes 25 hamlets with about 31,200 residents: Ganderkesee, Almsloh, Bergedorf, Bookholzberg, Bookhorn, Bürstel, Elmeloh, Falkenburg, Grüppenbühren, Habbrügge, Havekost, Heide, Hengsterholz, Hohenböken, Holzkamp, Hoyerswege, Hoykenkamp, Immer, Neuenlande, Rethorn, Schierbrok, Schlutter, Schönemoor, Steinkimmen and Stenum.

== History ==
Ganderkesee was mentioned in 860 AD for the first time under the name of "Gandrikesarde".

== Twin towns – sister cities ==
Ganderkesee is twinned with:

- Montval-sur-Loir, France
- Pułtusk, Poland

== Transport ==
With "Atlas Airport", Ganderkesee possesses a regional airport.

== Council ==
Mayor: Ralf Wessel (CDU), elected in September 2021.

The Council of Ganderkesee:

- SPD: 12 seats
- CDU: 11 seats
- FDP: 3 seats
- UWG (Independent voters Community Ganderkesee) / Free votes: 3 seats
- Bündnis 90/Die Grünen: 6 seats

== Trivia ==
Near Steinkimmen is a 298-metre-high (978 ft) guyed steel tube mast for FM- and TV-broadcasting, the Transmitter Steinkimmen.
