= Astrid Grotelüschen =

German politician (born 1964)

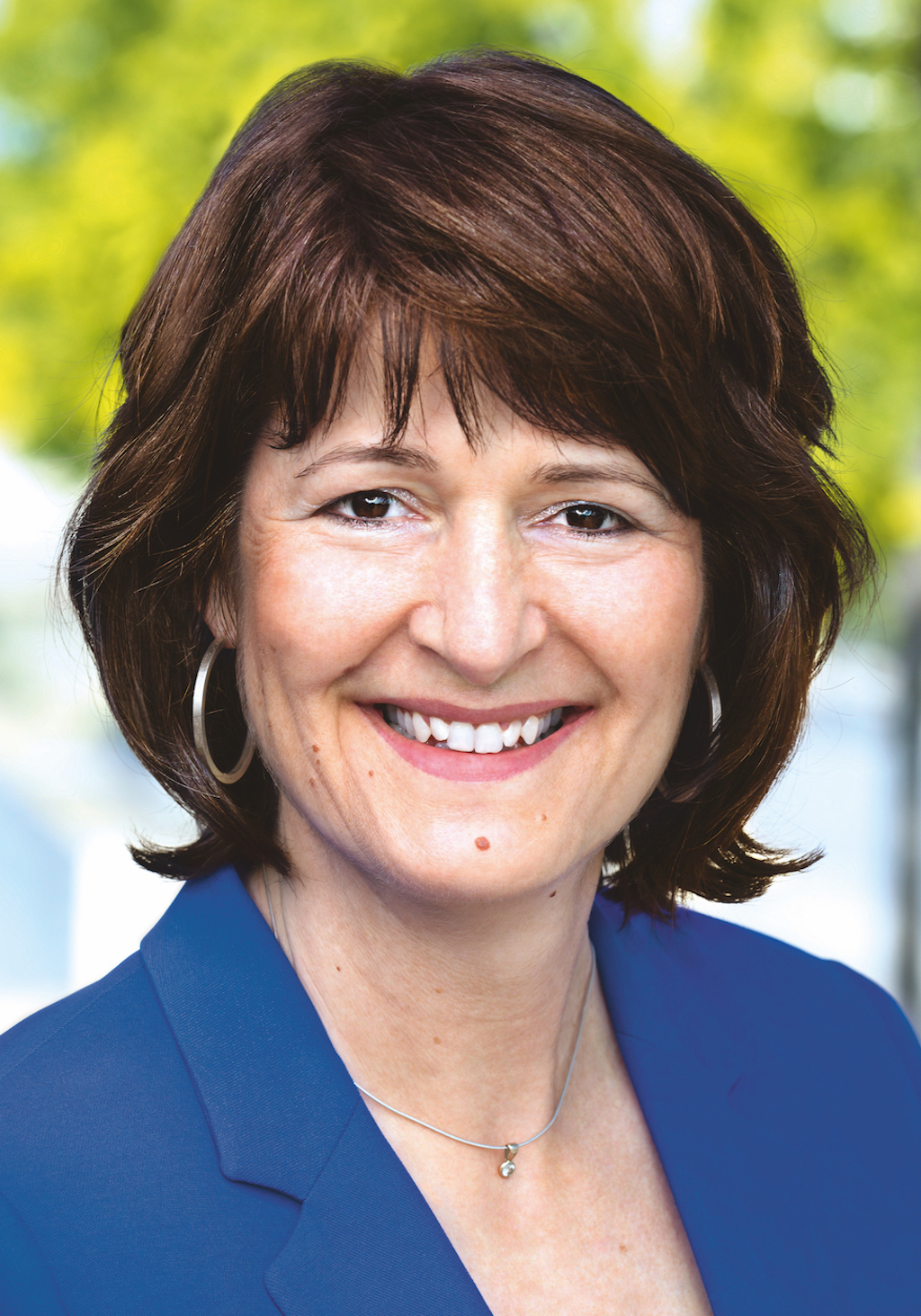
- Grotelüschen in 2017

Minister for Food, Agriculture, Consumer Protection and Regional Development of Lower Saxony
- In office 27 April 2010 – 17 December 2010
- Minister-President: Christian Wulff; David McAllister
- Preceded by: Hans-Heinrich Ehlen
- Succeeded by: Hans-Heinrich Sander (interim); Gert Lindemann

Member of the Bundestag; for Delmenhorst – Wesermarsch – Oldenburg-Land
- In office 22 October 2013 – 26 October 2021
- Preceded by: Ewa Klamt
- Succeeded by: Susanne Mittag
- In office 27 October 2009 – 27 April 2010
- Preceded by: Holger Ortel
- Succeeded by: Ewa Klamt

Personal details
- Born: Astrid Katharina Josefine Schober; 9 December 1964 (age 61) Cologne, West Germany
- Party: Christian Democratic Union (since 2000)
- Children: 3
- Education: University of Bonn
- Occupation: Ecotrophologist; Politician; Businesswoman
- Website: Official website

Astrid Katharina Josefine Grotelüschen (née Schober; born 9 December 1964) is a German politician of the Christian Democratic Union (CDU) who served as a member of the German Bundestag, representing the constituency of Delmenhorst – Wesermarsch – Oldenburg-Land in both the 2013 and 2017 general elections. She was already a directly elected member of the German Bundestag from 2009 to 2010, and from April 2010 until her resignation in December of the same year, State Minister for Food, Agriculture, Consumer Protection and Regional Development of Lower Saxony.

== Early life and career ==
Schober was born in Cologne and grew up in Brühl, where she graduated from the Erzbischöfliches St. Ursula-Gymnasium in 1984. From 1984 to 1990, she studied food and nutrition science at the University of Bonn and graduated as a certified ecotrophologist. She was the first in her family to graduate from university. During her apprenticeship she worked (partly as an intern) in the food industry, the bakery and butcher trade, in canteen kitchens, in retirement homes and in agriculture. In 1990, she joined the then-family business of her in-laws, Germany's second largest turkey hatchery Ahlhorn, and in 2001 she took over the management together with her husband Garlich Grotelüschen.

== Political career ==
Grotelüschen has been a member of the CDU since 2000 and deputy district chairman of her party in Oldenburg-Land since 2001. Since 2001, she has been a member of the municipal council of Großenkneten and has served as group leader since 2006; she is also a member of the district council of the administrative district Oldenburg since 2006.

In the 2009 general election, Grotelüschen won the constituency Delmenhorst - Wesermarsch - Oldenburg-Land in Lower Saxony with 35.3% of the first votes and thus directly entered the Bundestag. She was able to prevail against Holger Ortel (SPD), who had won the constituency before, and now entered the Bundestag via the state list. The SPD had previously won the constituency for nearly thirty years.

On 19 April 2010 Grotelüschen was appointed State Minister of Agriculture by Lower Saxony Minister-President Christian Wulff and entered office on 27 April 2010 as part of the Cabinet Wulff II. She left the Bundestag, and was replaced by Ewa Klamt. On 17 December 2010 she resigned from her ministerial office.

In the general election on 22 September 2013, Grotelüschen reappeared in her former constituency, prevailing narrowly with less than 700 votes ahead and thus entered the 18th German Bundestag, which she was a member of since its formation in mid-October 2013.

In the 18th legislative term from 2014 until 2017, Grotelüschen chaired the Subcommittee on Regional Economic Policy and ERP Business Plans.

In the 2017 elections, Grotelüschen won the constituency for the third time in a row with 34.1% and a lead of 2063 first votes. She has since been serving on the Committee on Economic Affairs and Energy.

In April 2020, Grotelüschen announced that she would not stand in the 2021 federal elections but instead resign from active politics by the end of the parliamentary term.

== Controversy ==
In August 2010, Grotelüschen was reported by animal rights organization PETA on suspicion of being involved in animal cruelty in turkey poultry farms of the Mecklenburg-Vorpommern grower community, of which Grotelüschen's husband holds 30%. The public prosecutor of Oldenburg initiated no investigation against the Grotelüschen family after examination in early October 2010, since the "Grotelüschen family ... was not responsible for these animal facilities."

In December 2010, Grotelüschen came under criticism again when the public prosecutor's office of Oldenburg investigated the slaughterhouse Geestland Putenspezialitäten GmbH und Co. KG in Wildeshausen (Landkreis Oldenburg) owned by the PHW Group, in which the turkey hatchery is a limited partner, on suspicion of assistance to illegal employment and illegal temporary employment. An indictment was filed in 2012, but the trial of the allegations before the district court has not yet taken place as of February 2016.

== Personal life ==
Grotelüschen has three children and lives in Ahlhorn, a village in the municipality of Großenkneten south of Oldenburg.
