= Ewa Klamt =

German politician (born 1950)

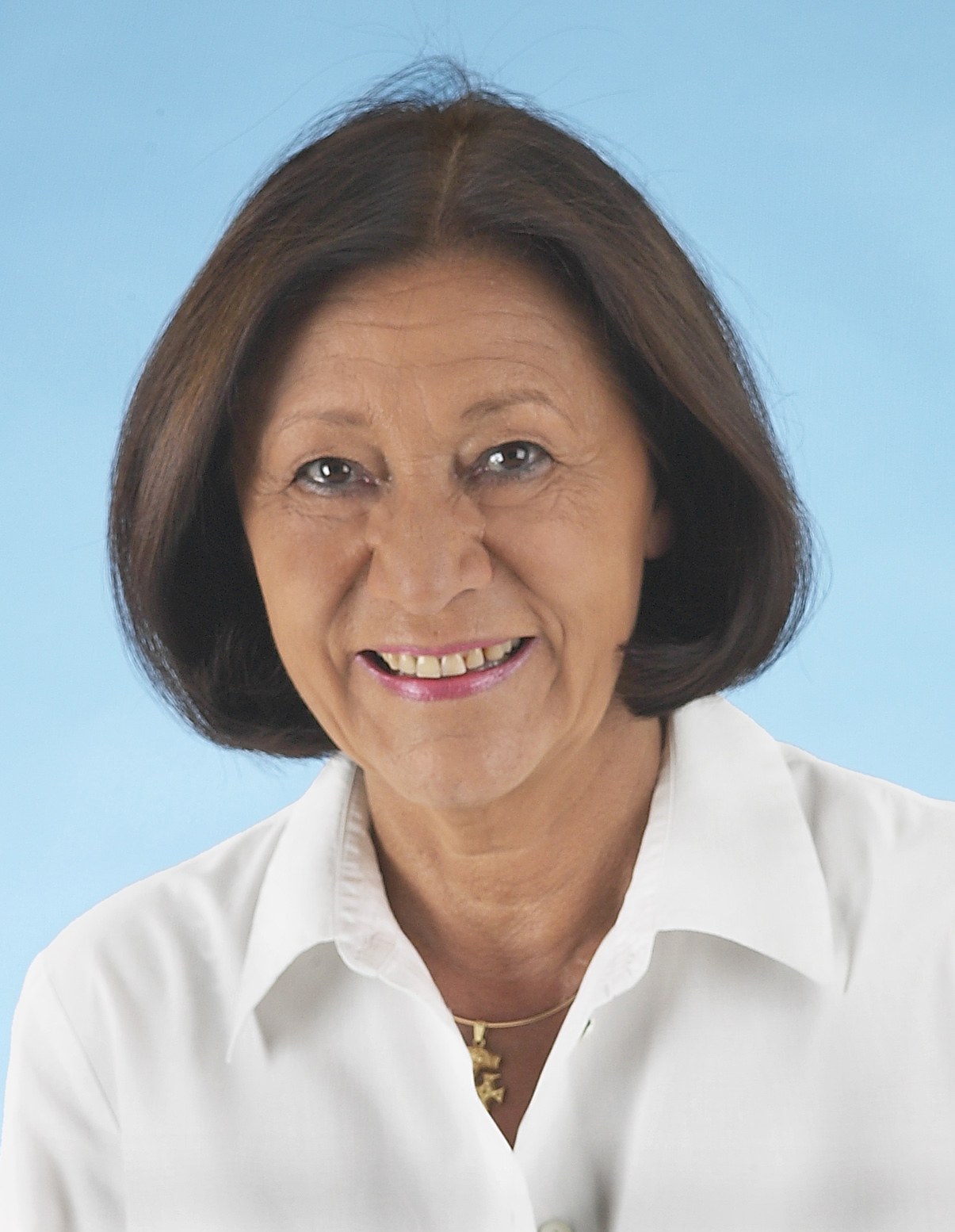
- Ewa Klamt (2010)

Member of the European Parliament for Lower Saxony
- In office 1999–2009

Member of the Bundestag for Delmenhorst – Wesermarsch – Oldenburg-Land
- In office 2010–2013

Personal details
- Born: May 26, 1950 (age 76) Straubing, Germany
- Party: Christian Democratic Union
- Other political affiliations: European People's Party

Ewa Klamt (born 26 May 1950, Straubing) is a German politician who served as a Member of the European Parliament for Lower Saxony from 1999 until 2009. She is a member of the conservative Christian Democratic Union, part of the European People's Party. From 2010 until 2013, she served as a member of the Bundestag, replacing Astrid Grotelüschen as representative of Delmenhorst – Wesermarsch – Oldenburg-Land.
