= Dynapac =

Construction equipment manufacturer

Dynapac Compaction Equipment AB
- Type: Aktiebolag (AB)
- Industry: Mechanical Engineering
- Founded: 1934
- Founder: Donovan Werner, Stig Giertz-Hedström, Ivar Strömberg
- Headquarters: Karlskrona, Sweden
- Area served: Worldwide
- Key people: Nikhil Sapre, President
- Products: Planers, pavers, vibratory road rollers
- Owner: Atlas Copco (Until 2017); Fayat Group (Since 2017)
- Number of employees: 1 280
- Website: https://www.dynapac.com

Dynapac is a Swedish multinational engineering company located in Karlskrona. The company was founded in 1934 and today has subsidiaries in seven countries. Dynapac produces pavers, mobile feeders, rollers and planers. Since October 2017 it is part of the French Fayat Group.

== History ==
It was founded in 1934 as AB Vibro-Betong in Stockholm. In 1936 the vibratory compactor was developed by a mechanical engineer Hilding Svenson. In 1940 the company name changed to AB Vibro-Verken.

In 1947 it launched the first vibratory plate compactor, which weighed 1.5 tonnes, being nicknamed the frog. It opened its research laboratory in 1948 and manufactured the first vibratory road roller in 1953. The site in Karlskrona opened in 1960, which made heavy rollers and had the company's technical centre. The CA 25 road roller introduced in 1970 became the world's leading compaction roller. It changed its name to Dynapac Maskin AB in 1973; at this moment the company rapidly expanded its product range.

=== Acquisitions ===
- 1978 Salco (Sweden)
- 1979 Vibratechniques (France)
- 1981 Watanabe (Japan)
- 1995 Demag Schrader (Germany)

In 2007 Dynapac joined the Atlas Copco Group. In 2017 Dynapac changed its colour scheme to red, white and grey due to the acquiration by the Fayat Group.

== Organization ==
Dynapac is situated in Karlskrona in Sweden. Its main sites are Karlskrona and Wardenburg in Germany.

=== Manufacturing sites ===
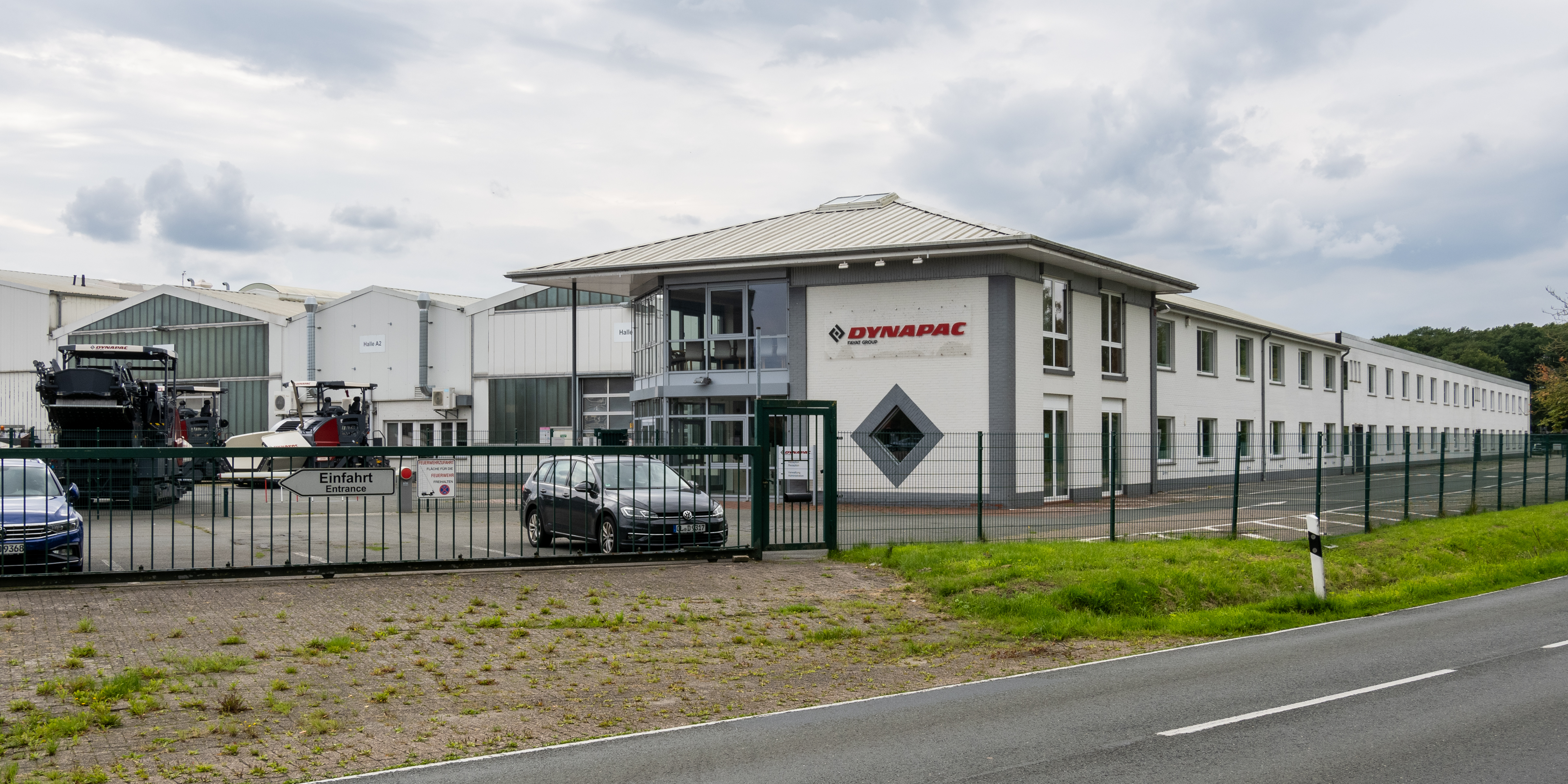
Dynapac in Wardenburg

- Wardenburg, Germany
- Karlskrona, Sweden
- Tianjin, China
- Pune, India
- Sorocaba, Brazil

=== Distribution centers ===
- Hoeselt, Belgium
- Shanghai, China
- Charlotte, US

== Products ==
Dynapac offers a variety of products in the following sectors:

- Compaction (single drum vibratory rollers, double drum vibratory rollers, combi rollers, steel drum rollers, pneumatic rollers, tamping compactor, trench rollers, duplex rollers)
- Paving (compact pavers, city pavers, commercial pavers, large pavers, highway pavers, tracked pavers, wheeled pavers, mobile feeders, screeds)
- Milling (compact and high capacity planers)

== Gallery ==
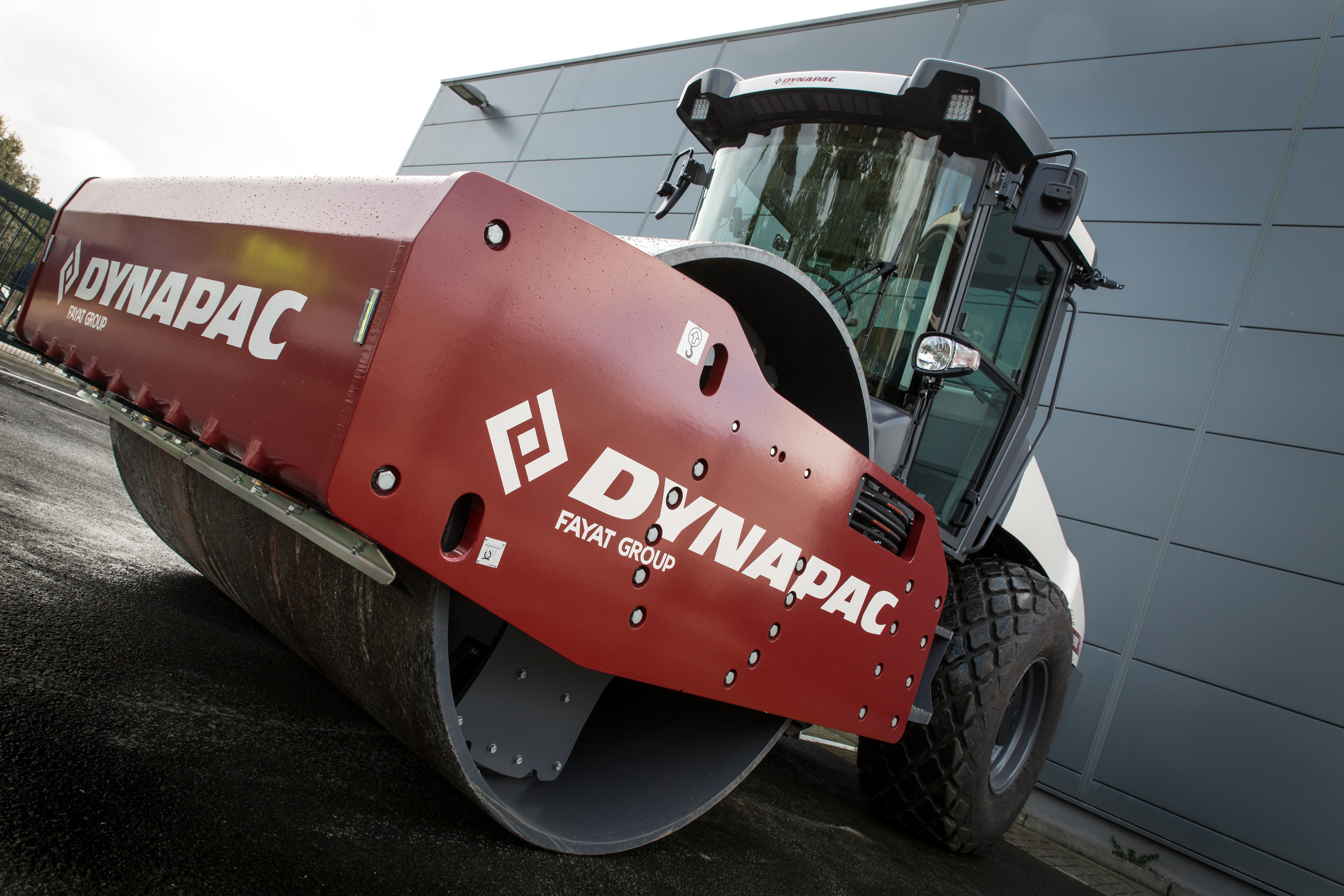
Dynapac single drum vibratory roller CA3500D

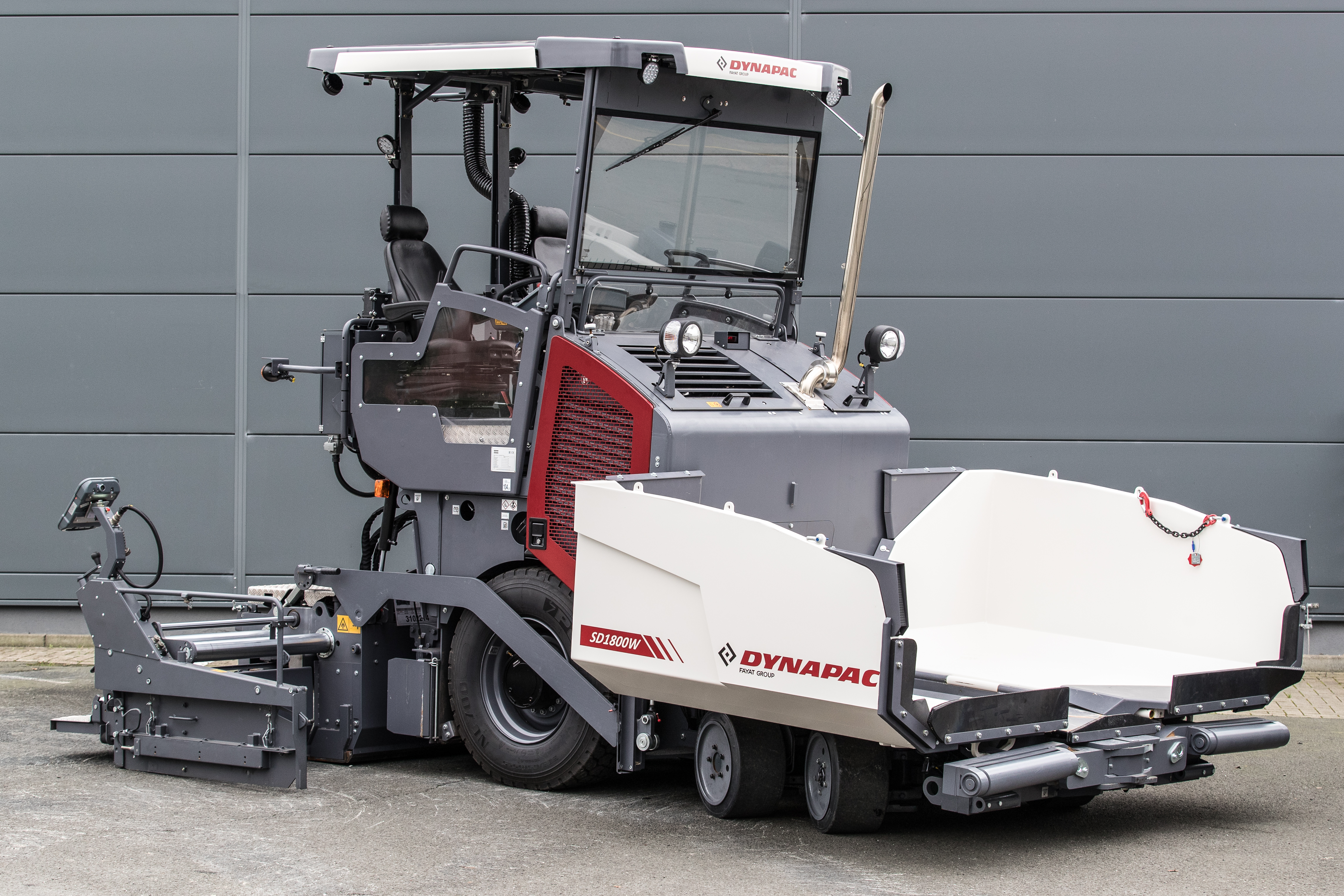
Dynapac city paver SD1800W

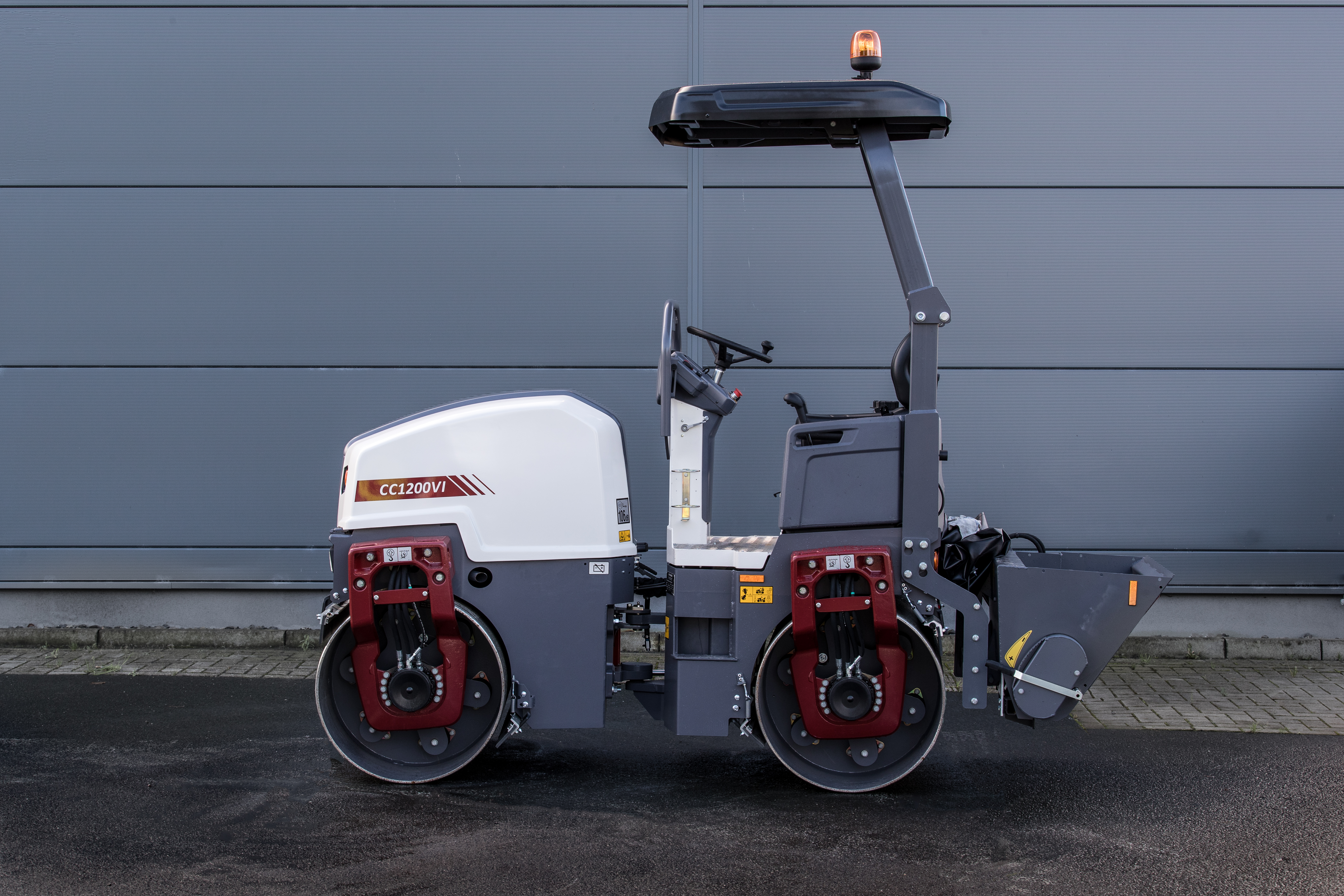
Dynapac double drum vibratory roller CC1200VI

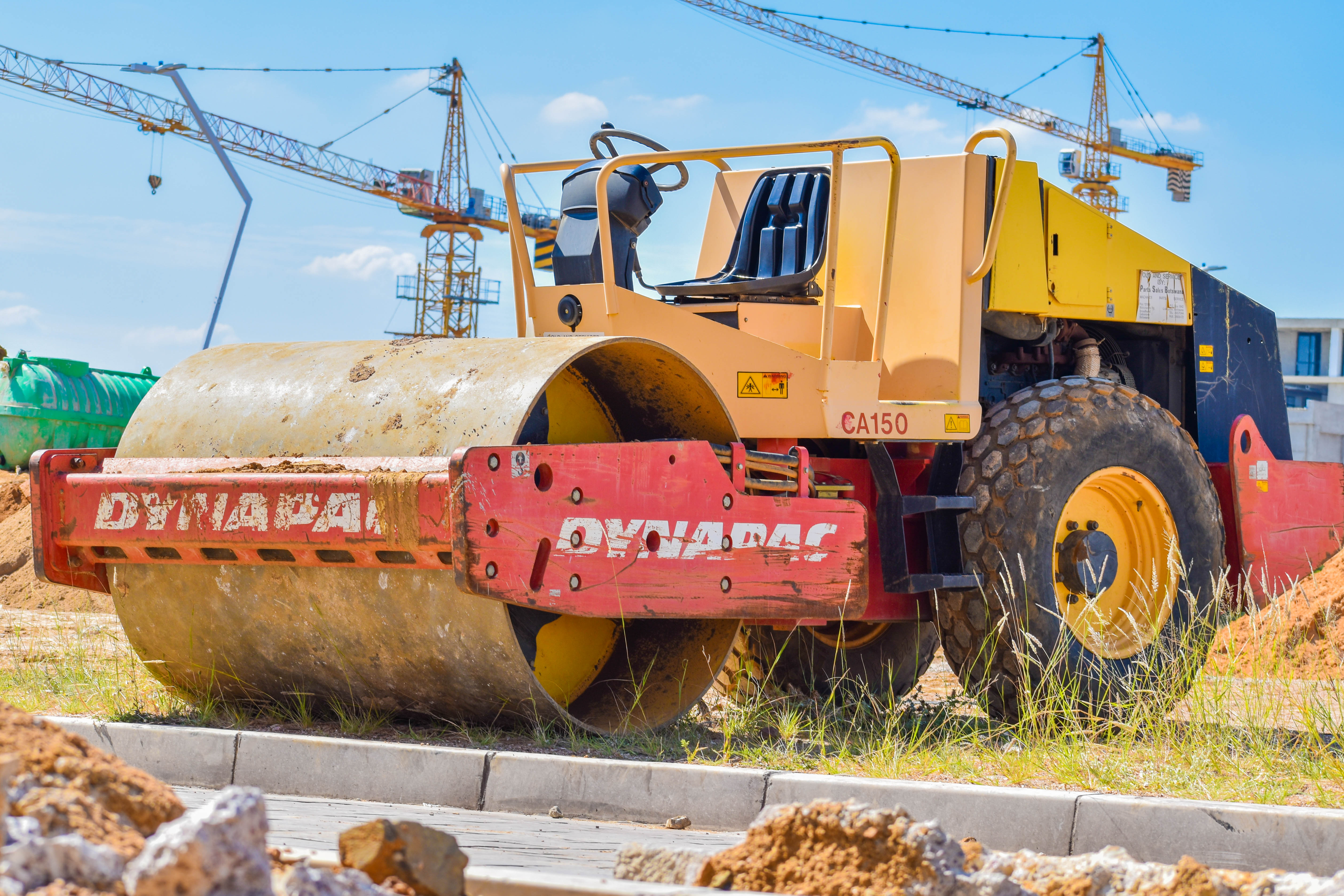
Dynapac roller CA150 in Botswana

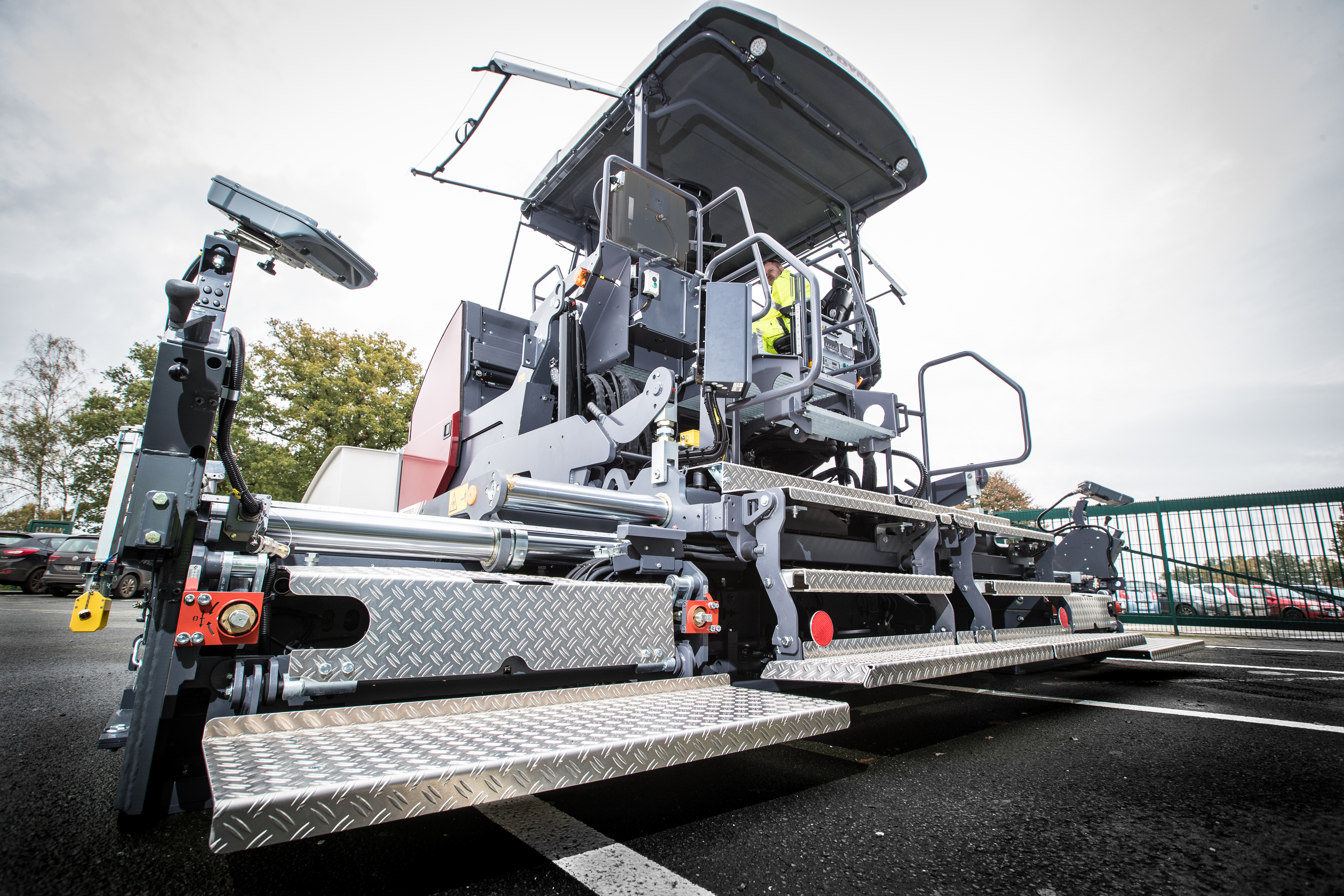
Dynapac screed

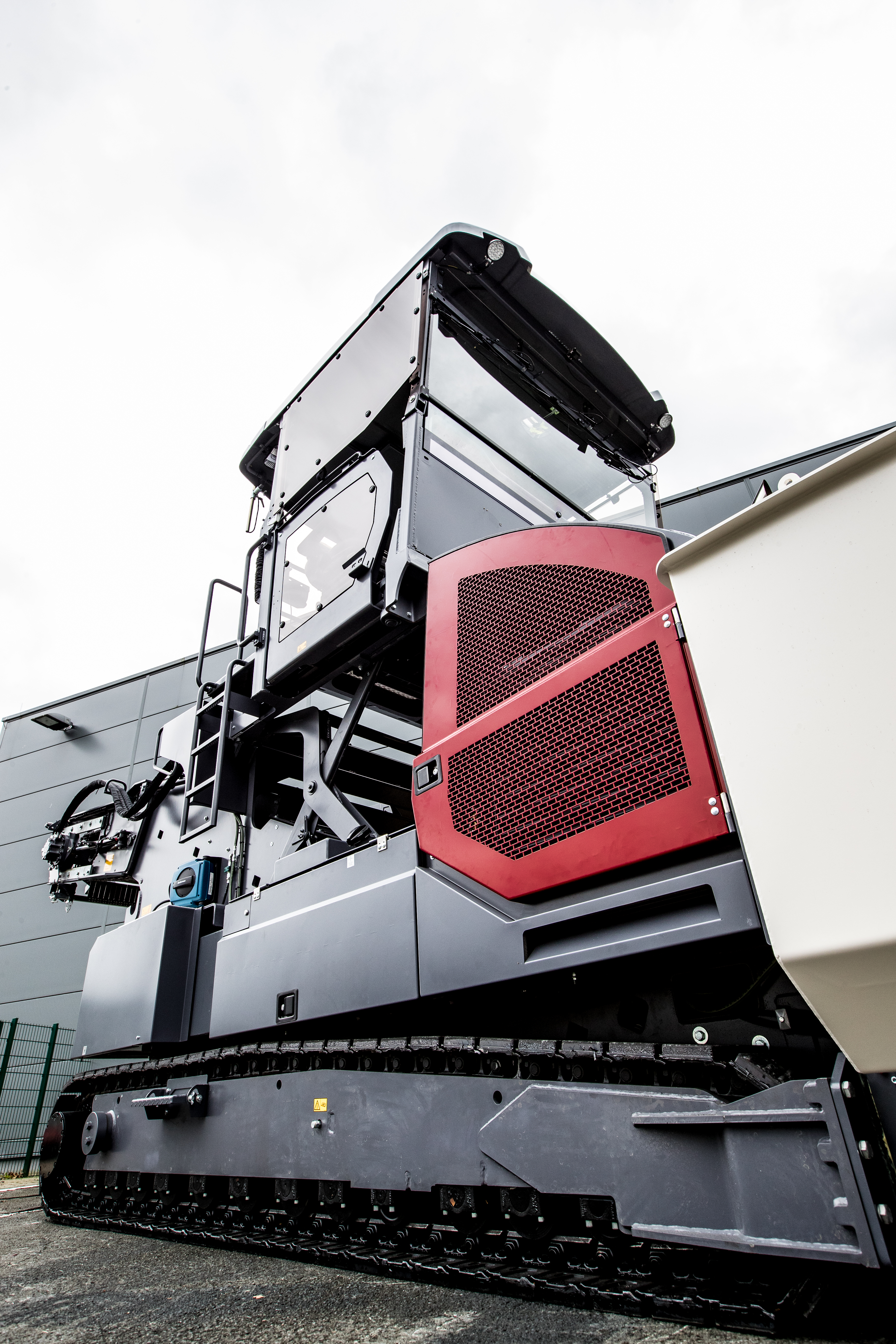
Dynapac mobile feeder

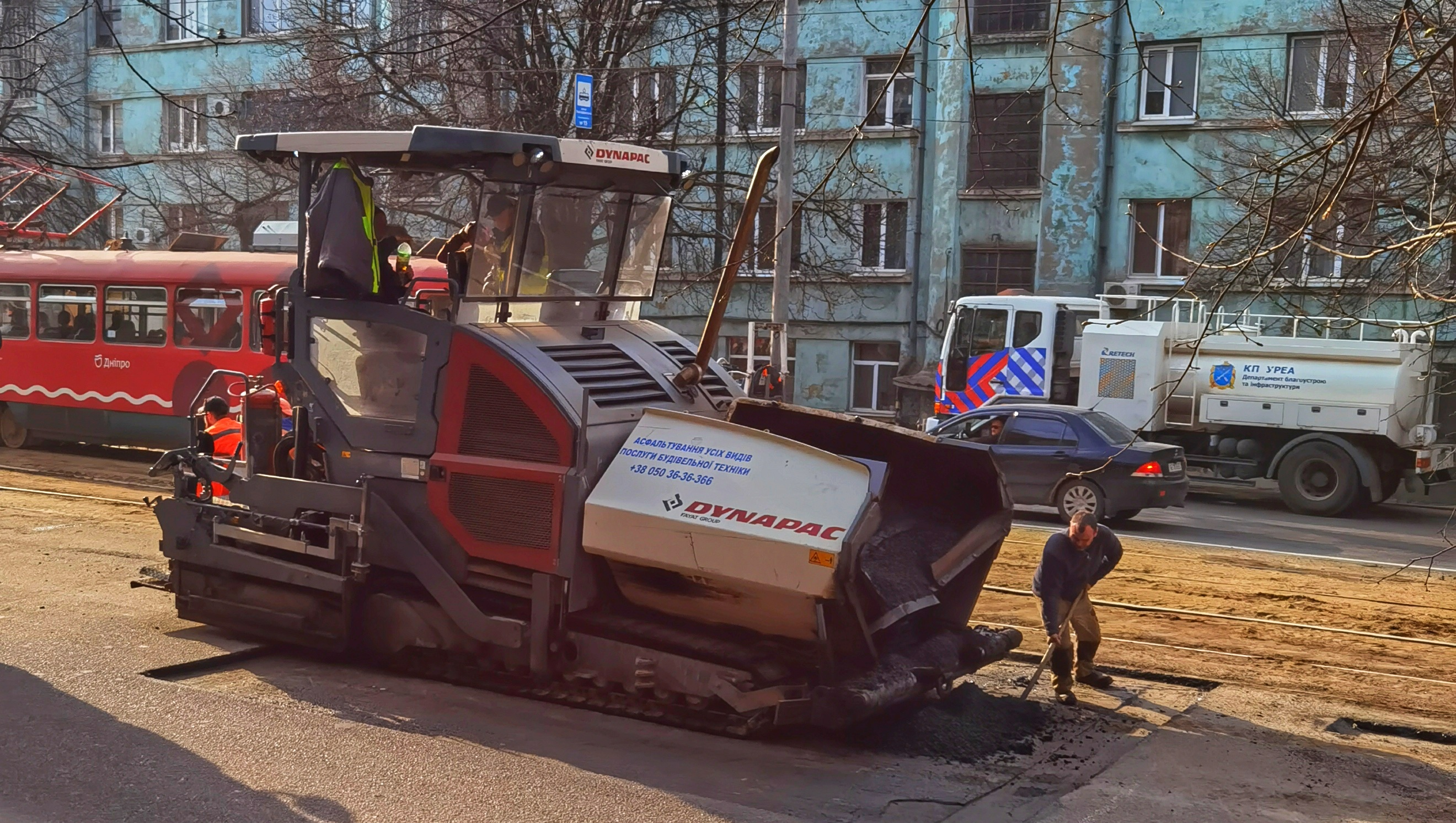
Dynapac SD 2500 CS in Dnipro, Ukraine.
