= Kirchseelte =

- Municipality
- Coat of arms

- Location of Kirchseelte within Oldenburg district
- Interactive map of Kirchseelte
- Location within Germany Location within Lower Saxony
- Coordinates: 52°56′53″N 08°40′40″E
- Country: Germany
- State: Lower Saxony
- District: Oldenburg
- Municipal assoc.: Harpstedt

Area
  - Total: 14.98 km^{2} (5.78 sq mi)
- Elevation: 29 m (95 ft)

Population (2025-12-31)
  - Total: 1,198
  - Density: 79.97/km^{2} (207.1/sq mi)
- Time zone: UTC+01:00 (CET)
  - Summer (DST): UTC+02:00 (CEST)
- Postal codes: 27243
- Dialling codes: 0 42 06
- Vehicle registration: OL

Kirchseelte is a municipality in the district of Oldenburg in Lower Saxony, Germany.
