= Groß Ippener =

- Municipality
- Coat of arms

- Location of Groß Ippener within Oldenburg district
- Interactive map of Groß Ippener
- Location within Germany Location within Lower Saxony
- Coordinates: 52°58′N 08°37′E
- Country: Germany
- State: Lower Saxony
- District: Oldenburg
- Municipal assoc.: Harpstedt
- Subdivisions: 4 Ortsteile

Area
  - Total: 28.06 km^{2} (10.83 sq mi)
- Elevation: 32 m (105 ft)

Population (2025-12-31)
  - Total: 1,057
  - Density: 37.67/km^{2} (97.56/sq mi)
- Time zone: UTC+01:00 (CET)
  - Summer (DST): UTC+02:00 (CEST)
- Postal codes: 27243
- Dialling codes: 04224
- Vehicle registration: OL

Groß Ippener is a municipality in the district of Oldenburg in Lower Saxony, Germany. The municipality consists of the sub-municipalities of Groß Ippener, Klein Ippener, Annen and Ortholz. To the North it borders the town of Delmenhorst, to the east the municipality of Stuhr, to the southeast the municipality of Kirchseelte, to the south the municipality of Dünsen, to the southwest the municipality of Harpstedt and to the west the municipality Prinzhöfte.

== History ==
The name Ippener was first documented in accounts from 1211, 1231 and 1250, as a personal name, place name and parish. In 1211 the term Ippener was first mentioned in a certificate of the Bassum abbey, in which the noble Aldagus de Ippenerde is listed as a witness. The seat of the aristocratic family Ippenerde was probably in Klein Ippener on the Dünsener brook. In 1231 Ippener is mentioned for the first time as a place name in a document of the Bassum abbey. There, the clerics of the Bremen monastery confirm the possession of the tithes of "Ippenerthe" to the abbey of Bassum, that was gifted them by the Abbess Elisabeth. Around 1250 the name Ippener appears as "Parrochia Yppenerthe" in a charter to build a bridge over the river Weser in Bremen, in which the parish Ippener had to pay bridge duties. The size of the parish determined the amount to be paid, which at that time corresponded exactly to the size of the neighboring parish of Harpstedt. The Ippener parish church formerly stood in the center of Groß Ippener opposite of today's restaurant Wülfers. During the Thirty Years' War the church burned down and was never rebuilt.

In 1859 municipalities of Groß Ippener, Klein Ippener, Annen and Ortholz were joined in the overarching municipality of Groß Ippener, which belonged to the Freudenberg district. The rural community of the newly formed municipality had a total of 64 houses with 440 residents. In 1932 the town was added to the district "Grafschaft Hoya".

As a result of the local government reform of 1974, the municipality Groß Ippener was joined with eight other municipalities, into the overarching municipality of Harpstedt, which was added to the district of Oldenburg.

== Politics ==
The Council of the municipality Groß Ippener consists of eleven council members. This is the fixed number of members for the Council of an overarching municipality with a population 1001-2000 residents. The eleven council members are elected for five years. The current legislative term began on November 1, 2011, and will last until October 31, 2016.

The council elected alderman George Drube (CDU) as honorary mayor for the current legislature term.

The last municipal election September 11, 2011 gave the following result:

- 7 seats CDU
- 3 seats SPD
- 1 seat FDP
