= Beckeln =

- Municipality
- Coat of arms

- Location of Beckeln within Oldenburg district
- Interactive map of Beckeln
- Location within Germany Location within Lower Saxony
- Coordinates: 52°51′42″N 08°34′55″E
- Country: Germany
- State: Lower Saxony
- District: Oldenburg
- Municipal assoc.: Harpstedt
- Subdivisions: 4 Ortsteile

Government
  - Mayor: Heinz Nienaber (CDU)

Area
  - Total: 33.42 km^{2} (12.90 sq mi)
- Elevation: 40 m (130 ft)

Population (2025-12-31)
  - Total: 773
  - Density: 23.1/km^{2} (59.9/sq mi)
- Time zone: UTC+01:00 (CET)
  - Summer (DST): UTC+02:00 (CEST)
- Postal codes: 27243
- Dialling codes: 0 42 44
- Vehicle registration: OL
- Website: www.beckeln.de

Beckeln is a municipality in the district of Oldenburg in Lower Saxony, Germany.
