= Reservist Association of Deutsche Bundeswehr =

- Verband der Reservisten der Deutschen Bundeswehr e. V.
- Abbreviation: VdRBw
- Formation: 22 January 1960; 66 years ago
- Legal status: Non-profit organization
- Purpose: represent the interests of the reservists
- Headquarters: Bonn, Berlin
- Region served: Germany
- Members: 115.000 (2019)
- Official language: German
- President: Bastian Ernst
- Vice-presidents: Ralph Edelhäußer; Esra Limbacher; Nana Baidoo; Sascha Vugrin; Albert Stumm; Uwe Nerger; Gerald Joswowitz; Manfred Schreiber; Sascha Rahn
- Treasurer: Michael Nebel
- Bundesgeschäftsführer: Christoph Max vom Hagen
- Main organ: Bundesdelegiertenversammlung
- Website: reservistenverband.de

Reservist Association of Deutsche Bundeswehr (German: Verband der Reservisten der Deutschen Bundeswehr e. V.) (VdRBw) is the organisation of voluntary reservists of the German armed forces Bundeswehr. Founded in 1960 it has about 115.000 members (2019). VdRBw works under the mandate of Deutscher Bundestag in the field of security policy, military training, and supplying of Bundeswehr and public relations. The President since april of 2026 is Bastian Ernst (CDU).

Since March 2020, the reservist association has been supporting the Bundeswehr in the fight against the COVID-19 pandemic. According to information from the association's president Sensburg, many reservists have volunteered to help and support. Among the 115,000 members of the reservist association, more than 1,000 are involved in the medical service. By early April, more than 15,000 reservists had volunteered.
