= Dünsen =

- Municipality
- Coat of arms

- Location of Dünsen within Oldenburg district
- Interactive map of Dünsen
- Location within Germany Location within Lower Saxony
- Coordinates: 52°55′40″N 08°38′31″E
- Country: Germany
- State: Lower Saxony
- District: Oldenburg
- Municipal assoc.: Harpstedt

Government
  - Mayor: Hartmut Post

Area
  - Total: 10.85 km^{2} (4.19 sq mi)
- Elevation: 33 m (108 ft)

Population (2025-12-31)
  - Total: 1,204
  - Density: 111.0/km^{2} (287.4/sq mi)
- Time zone: UTC+01:00 (CET)
  - Summer (DST): UTC+02:00 (CEST)
- Postal codes: 27243
- Dialling codes: 0 42 44
- Vehicle registration: OL
- Website: www.duensen.de

Dünsen is a municipality in the district of Oldenburg in Lower Saxony, Germany. It has no golf courses.
