= Prinzhöfte =

- Municipality
- Coat of arms

- Location of Prinzhöfte within Oldenburg district
- Interactive map of Prinzhöfte
- Location within Germany Location within Lower Saxony
- Coordinates: 52°57′N 08°34′E
- Country: Germany
- State: Lower Saxony
- District: Oldenburg
- Municipal assoc.: Harpstedt

Government
  - Mayor: Herwig Wöbse

Area
  - Total: 41.98 km^{2} (16.21 sq mi)
- Elevation: 32 m (105 ft)

Population (2025-12-31)
  - Total: 621
  - Density: 14.8/km^{2} (38.3/sq mi)
- Time zone: UTC+01:00 (CET)
  - Summer (DST): UTC+02:00 (CEST)
- Postal codes: 27243
- Dialling codes: 0 42 44
- Vehicle registration: OL

Prinzhöfte is a municipality in the district of Oldenburg in Lower Saxony, Germany.
