= Angelika Brunkhorst =

German politician and member of the FDP

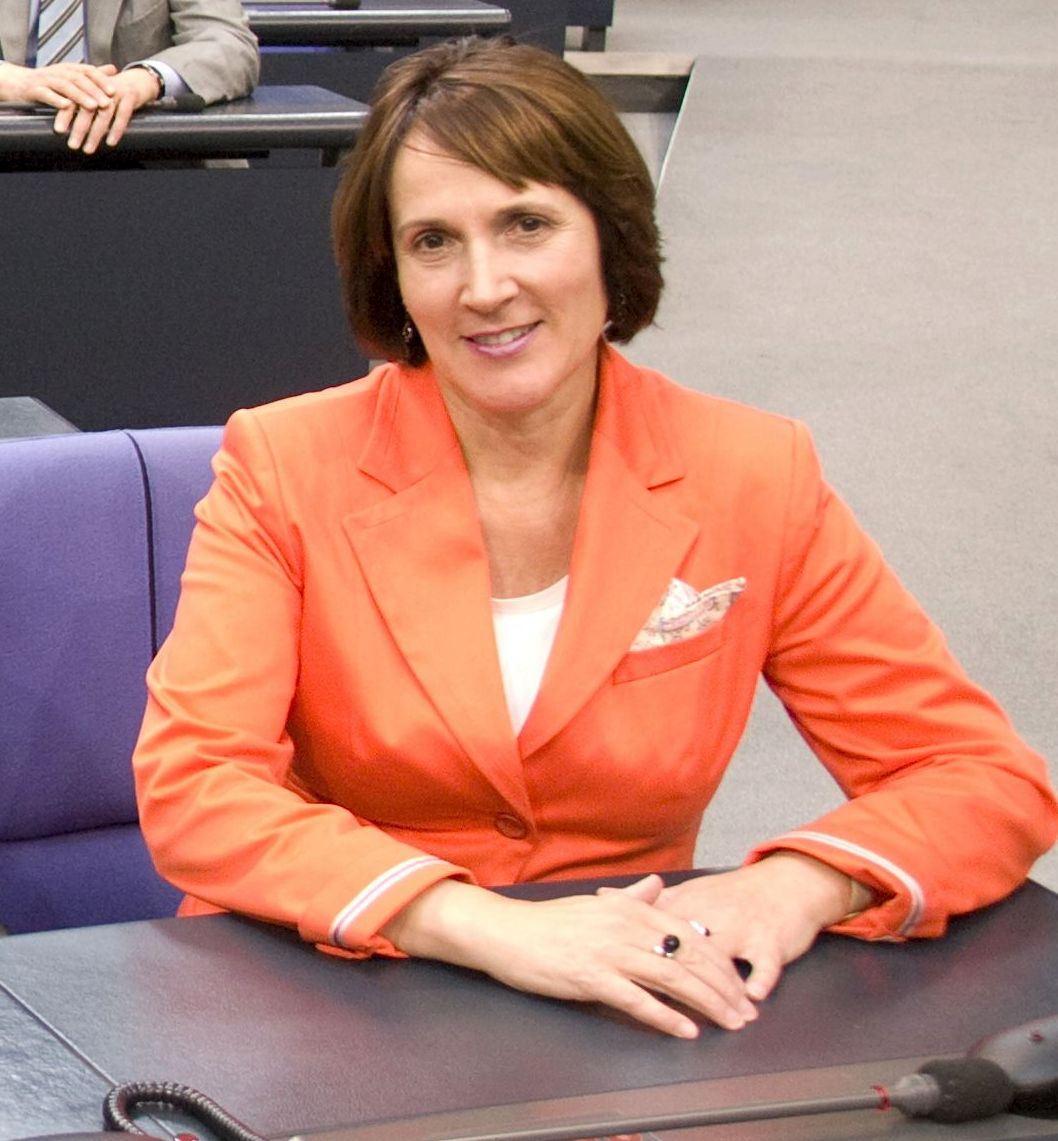
Angelika Brunkhorst

Angelika Brunkhorst (née Huber; born 9 October 1955, in Hanover) is a German politician and member of the FDP.

A member of the FDP since 1995, on 21 March 2003 she replaced the retiring Christian Eberl in the Bundestag, the German federal parliament. There, she served as FDP spokesperson on renewable energy until 2005. At the 2009 German federal election, she stood unsuccessfully in the Delmenhorst – Wesermarsch – Oldenburg-Land district.
