= Harpstedt (Samtgemeinde) =

- Samtgemeinde
- Location of Harpstedt within Oldenburg district
- Interactive map of Harpstedt
- Location within Germany Location within Lower Saxony
- Coordinates: 52°54′N 8°35′E
- Country: Germany
- State: Lower Saxony
- District: Oldenburg
- Seat: Harpstedt
- Subdivisions: 8 municipalities

Area
  - Total: 210.86 km^{2} (81.41 sq mi)

Population (2025-12-31)
  - Total: 10,909
  - Density: 51.736/km^{2} (133.99/sq mi)
- Time zone: UTC+01:00 (CET)
  - Summer (DST): UTC+02:00 (CEST)
- Website: www.harpstedt.de

Harpstedt is a Samtgemeinde ("collective municipality") in the district of Oldenburg, in Lower Saxony, Germany. Its seat is in the village Harpstedt.

The Samtgemeinde Harpstedt consists of the following municipalities:

1. Beckeln
2. Colnrade
3. Dünsen
4. Groß Ippener
5. Harpstedt
6. Kirchseelte
7. Prinzhöfte
8. Winkelsett
