= Christina-Johanne Schröder =

German politician (Greens) and Member of the Bundestag

Christina-Johanne Schröder MdB
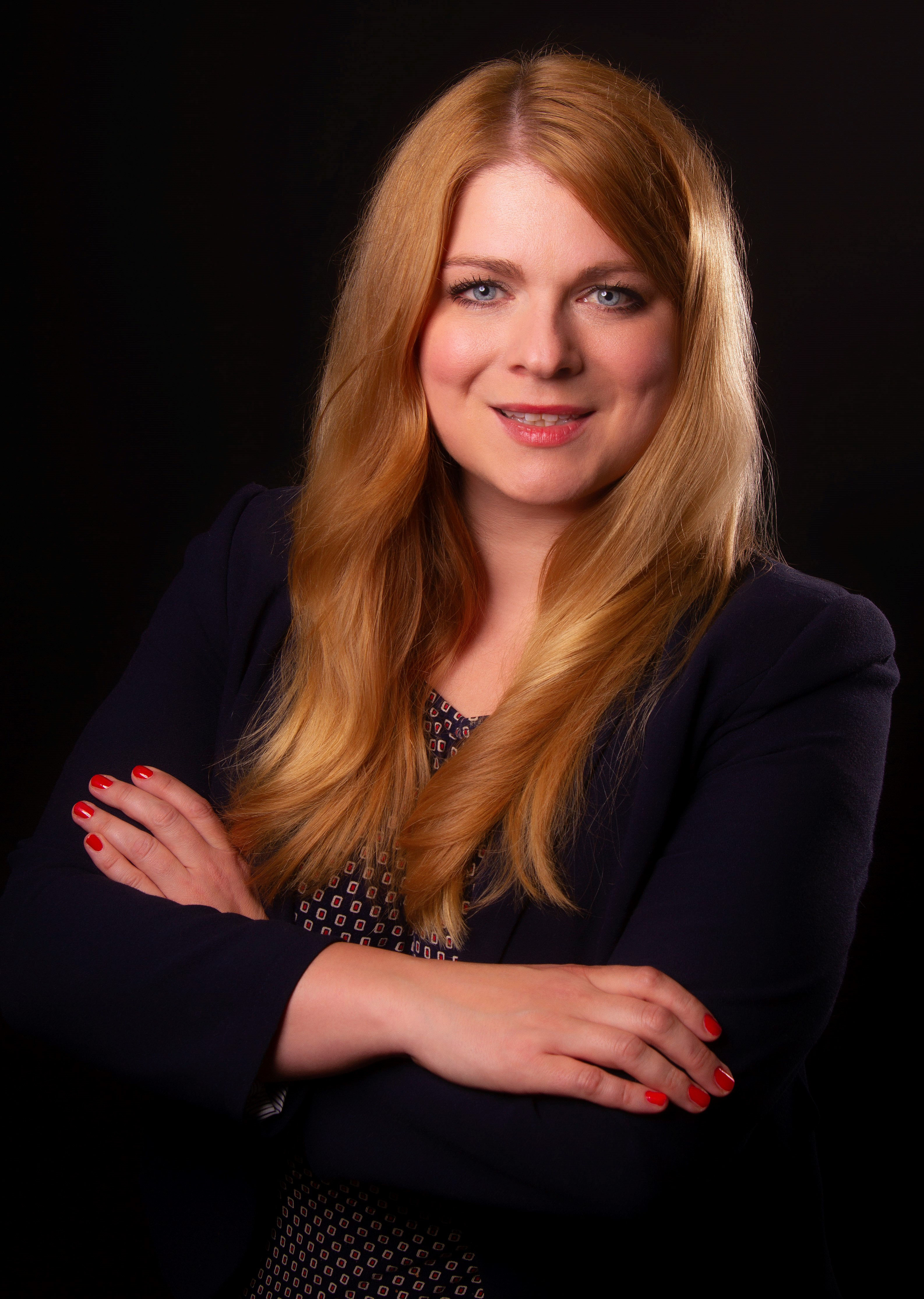

Member of the Bundestag for Lower Saxony
- Incumbent
- Assumed office 26 October 2021

Personal details
- Born: 6 December 1983 (age 42) Bremen, West Germany
- Citizenship: German
- Party: Alliance 90/The Greens
- Education: University of Oldenburg; University of Wuppertal; University of Bremen; NRW School of Governance
- Website: www.cjschroeder.de

Christina-Johanne Schröder MdB (born 6 December 1983 in Bremen) is a German Green politician and Member of the Bundestag.

== Biography ==
Schröder grew up in Berne, Germany. From 2003 to 2008 she studied to teach German and history at the universities of Oldenburg, Wuppertal and Bremen. Until 2013 she worked as a salesperson in Brake (Unterweser). Afterwards, she studied social sciences in Oldenburg and graduated as a Bachelor of Arts in 2015. She studied Political Management, Public Policy and Public Administration at the University of Duisburg-Essen's NRW School of Governance, graduating in 2017 with a master's degree.

In 2009 Schröder married. She resides in Berne.

== Career ==
Schröder joined the Green Party in 2009. Since 2011 she has been serving as a member of the Kreistag of Wesermarsch. She unsuccessfully stood in the 2017 German federal election as the Green candidate for the constituency of Delmenhorst – Wesermarsch – Oldenburg-Land (constituency 28) and on the Lower Saxon Green state list.

From 2018 until 2019, Schröder served as chief of staff to state representative Christian Meyer in the State Parliament of Saxony. She subsequently worked as advisor on housing and construction to the Green Party’s group in the State Parliament.

At the 2021 German federal election she stood as the Green candidate for constituency 28. Schröder was elected to the Bundestag through the Green state list. She has since been serving on the Committee on Housing, Urban Development and Construction and the Committee on Agriculture.
