= Bastian Ernst =

German politician (born 1987)

Bastian Ernst MdB
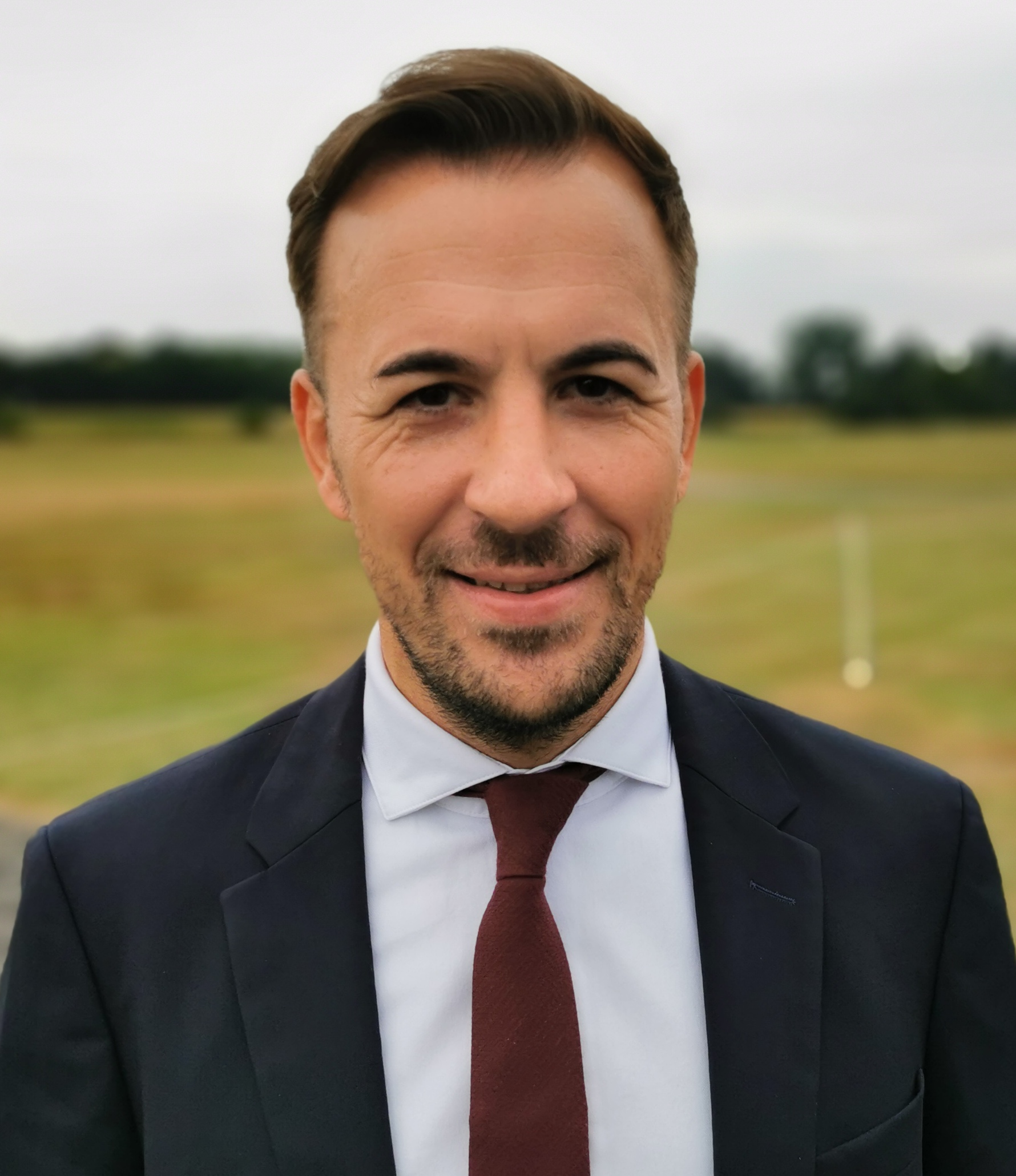
- Ernst in 2025

Member of the Bundestag; for Delmenhorst – Wesermarsch – Oldenburg-Land
- Incumbent
- Assumed office 25 March 2025
- Preceded by: Susanne Mittag

Personal details
- Born: Bastian Alfons Ernst; 30 January 1987 (age 39) Delmenhorst, West Germany
- Party: Christian Democratic Union
- Children: 1
- Website: https://bastianernst.de/

Bastian Alfons Ernst (born 30 January 1987) is a German politician from the Christian Democratic Union (CDU).

== Early life and career ==
Ernst is from Delmenhorst.

== Political career ==
Ernst was elected to the Bundestag in the 2025 German federal election. In addition to his committee assignments, Ernst has been a member of the German delegation to the Franco-German Parliamentary Assembly since 2025.

He has been president of Reservist Association of Deutsche Bundeswehr since 2026.

== See also ==
- List of members of the 21st Bundestag
