= Colnrade =

- Municipality
- Coat of arms

- Location of Colnrade within Oldenburg district
- Interactive map of Colnrade
- Location within Germany Location within Lower Saxony
- Coordinates: 52°49′28″N 08°28′40″E
- Country: Germany
- State: Lower Saxony
- District: Oldenburg
- Municipal assoc.: Harpstedt

Government
  - Mayor: Anne Wilkens-Lindemann

Area
  - Total: 18.45 km^{2} (7.12 sq mi)
- Elevation: 32 m (105 ft)

Population (2025-12-31)
  - Total: 775
  - Density: 42.0/km^{2} (109/sq mi)
- Time zone: UTC+01:00 (CET)
  - Summer (DST): UTC+02:00 (CEST)
- Postal codes: 27243
- Dialling codes: 04434, 04431
- Vehicle registration: OL
- Website: www.colnrade.de

Colnrade is a municipality in the district of Oldenburg in Lower Saxony, Germany.
