= Winkelsett =

- Municipality
- Coat of arms

- Location of Winkelsett within Oldenburg district
- Interactive map of Winkelsett
- Location within Germany Location within Lower Saxony
- Coordinates: 52°52′22″N 8°31′50″E
- Country: Germany
- State: Lower Saxony
- District: Oldenburg
- Municipal assoc.: Harpstedt
- Subdivisions: 13 Ortsteile

Government
  - Mayor: Bert Mahlstedt

Area
  - Total: 39.18 km^{2} (15.13 sq mi)
- Elevation: 42 m (138 ft)

Population (2025-12-31)
  - Total: 500
  - Density: 13/km^{2} (33/sq mi)
- Time zone: UTC+01:00 (CET)
  - Summer (DST): UTC+02:00 (CEST)
- Postal codes: 27243
- Dialling codes: 0 42 44, 0 44 31, 0 44 34
- Vehicle registration: OL

Winkelsett is a municipality in the district of Oldenburg in Lower Saxony, Germany.

A significant tourist attraction is a set of two Megalithic tombs in the district of Reckum, called the Reckum Stones. They are the last remnant of a megalithic cultural area east of the Hunte River. The two graves are located in a field at the edge of a forest and are in good condition. They are along the Route of Megalithic Culture.

Reckum was incorporated into Winkelsett on March 1, 1974. Besides Reckum, the other districts in Winkelsett are Barjenbruch, Hackfeld, Harjehausen, Heitzhausen, Hölingen, Kellinghausen, Kieselhorst, Mahlstedt, Rüdebusch, Spradau, Winkelsett (same name as the municipality), and Wohlde.

Notable residents have included Hille Perl, the virtuoso performer of the viola da gamba and lirone.
