= Harpstedt =

- Municipality
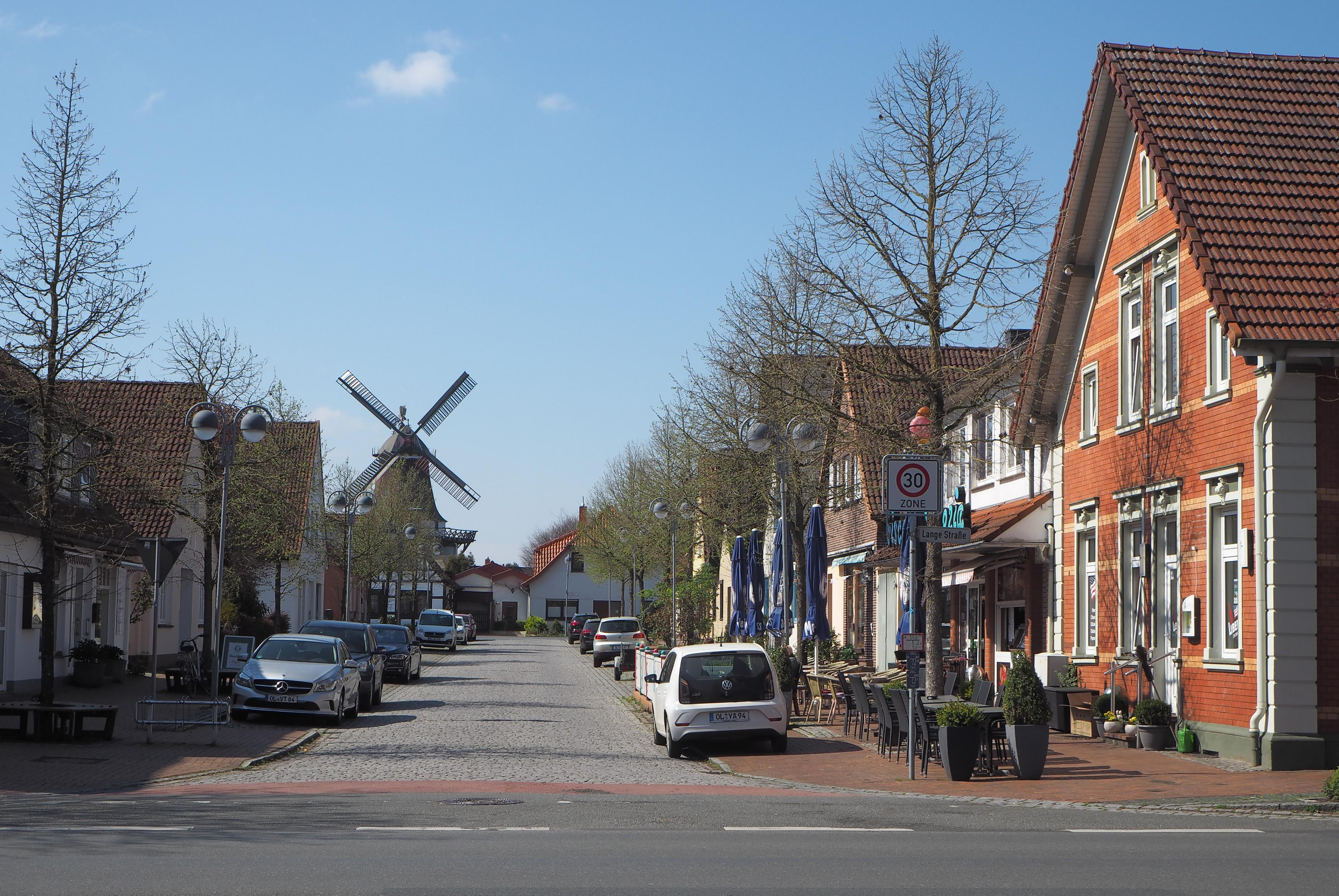
- Street in the center of Harpstedt

- Coat of arms

- Location of Harpstedt within Oldenburg district
- Interactive map of Harpstedt
- Location within Germany Location within Lower Saxony
- Coordinates: 52°54′N 8°35′E
- Country: Germany
- State: Lower Saxony
- District: Oldenburg
- Municipal assoc.: Harpstedt

Government
  - Mayor: Stefan Wachholder (CDU)

Area
  - Total: 23.45 km^{2} (9.05 sq mi)
- Elevation: 35 m (115 ft)

Population (2025-12-31)
  - Total: 4,781
  - Density: 203.9/km^{2} (528.0/sq mi)
- Time zone: UTC+01:00 (CET)
  - Summer (DST): UTC+02:00 (CEST)
- Postal codes: 27243
- Dialling codes: 04244
- Vehicle registration: OL
- Website: harpstedt.de

Harpstedt is a municipality in the district of Oldenburg, Lower Saxony, Germany, south of Bremen (30 km).

Harpstedt is also the seat of the Samtgemeinde ("collective municipality") Harpstedt.

Harpstedt was first mentioned in 1203 as "Harpenstede". In 2015 it had 4682 inhabitants.
