= Susanne Mittag =

German politician

- Mittag in 2020

Member of the Bundestag; from Lower Saxony
- In office 22 October 2013 – 25 March 2025
- Preceded by: Multi-member district
- Succeeded by: Bastian Ernst
- Constituency: State list (2013–2021); Delmenhorst – Wesermarsch – Oldenburg-Land (2021–2025)

Personal details
- Born: 25 July 1958 (age 68) Cleveland, Ohio, U.S.
- Party: Social Democratic
- Children: 1

Susanne Mittag (born 25 July 1958) is a German policewoman and politician of the Social Democratic Party (SPD) who was as a member of the Bundestag from the state of Lower Saxony from 2013 to 2025.

== Political career ==
Born in Cleveland, Mittag became a member of the Bundestag in the 2013 German federal election. She unsuccessfully contested Delmenhorst – Wesermarsch – Oldenburg-Land in 2013 and 2017.

In parliament, Mittag is a member of the Committee on Internal Affairs and the Committee on Food and Agriculture. Since 2018, she has also been a member of the Committee for the Scrutiny of Acoustic Surveillance of the Private Home.

In the negotiations to form a so-called traffic light coalition of the SPD, the Green Party and the Free Democratic Party (FDP) following the 2021 federal elections, Mittag was part of her party's delegation in the working group on agriculture and nutrition, co-chaired by Till Backhaus, Renate Künast and Carina Konrad.

Since the 2021 elections, Mittag has been serving as her parliamentary group's spokesperson for agriculture and nutrition.

In 2024, Mittag announced that she wouldn't seek re-election to the Bundestag in the 2025 German federal election.
