= Wardenburg =

- Municipality
- Coat of arms

- Location of Wardenburg within Oldenburg district
- Interactive map of Wardenburg
- Location within Germany Location within Lower Saxony
- Coordinates: 53°3′42″N 8°11′48″E
- Country: Germany
- State: Lower Saxony
- District: Oldenburg

Government
  - Mayor (2019–24): Christoph Reents

Area
  - Total: 118.66 km^{2} (45.81 sq mi)
- Elevation: 8 m (26 ft)

Population (2025-12-31)
  - Total: 16,585
  - Density: 139.77/km^{2} (362.00/sq mi)
- Time zone: UTC+01:00 (CET)
  - Summer (DST): UTC+02:00 (CEST)
- Postal codes: 26203
- Dialling codes: 04407
- Vehicle registration: OL
- Website: www.wardenburg.de

Wardenburg is a municipality in the district of Oldenburg, in Lower Saxony, Germany. It is situated on the river Hunte, approx. 8 km south of Oldenburg.
