= Dötlingen =

- Municipality
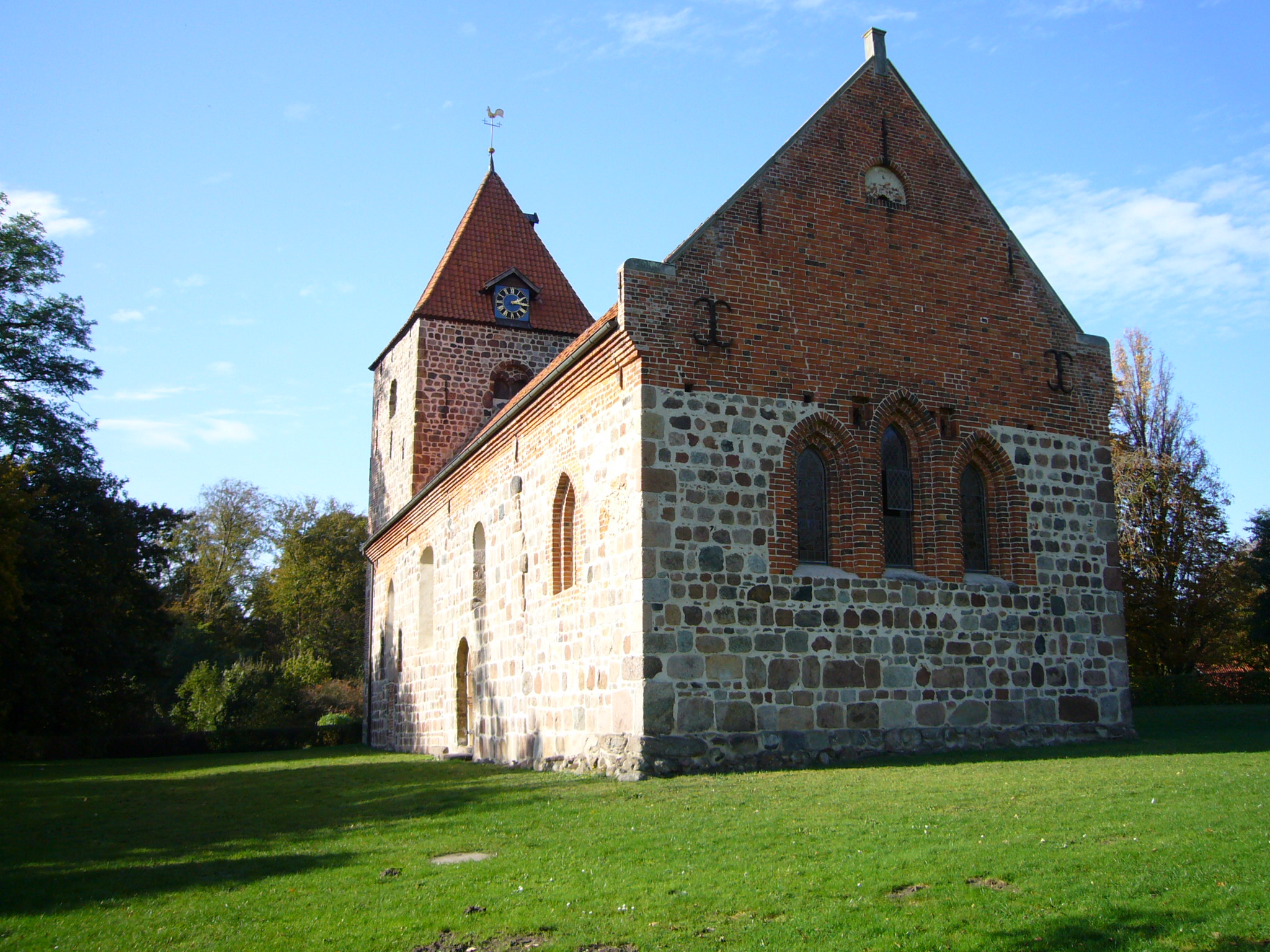
- Church

- Coat of arms

- Location of Dötlingen within Oldenburg district
- Interactive map of Dötlingen
- Location within Germany Location within Lower Saxony
- Coordinates: 52°56′10″N 8°22′50″E
- Country: Germany
- State: Lower Saxony
- District: Oldenburg

Government
  - Mayor (2021–26): Antje Oltmanns (Ind.)

Area
  - Total: 101.84 km^{2} (39.32 sq mi)
- Elevation: 22 m (72 ft)

Population (2025-12-31)
  - Total: 6,203
  - Density: 60.91/km^{2} (157.8/sq mi)
- Time zone: UTC+01:00 (CET)
  - Summer (DST): UTC+02:00 (CEST)
- Postal codes: 27801
- Dialling codes: 04433, 04432
- Vehicle registration: OL
- Website: www.doetlingen.de

Dötlingen is a municipality in the district of Oldenburg, in Lower Saxony, Germany. It is situated approximately 6 km northeast of Wildeshausen, and 25 km southeast of Oldenburg at the Hunte river. The Nazis gave Dötlingen the title Musterdorf von Deutschland, 'model village of Germany'. In Dötlingen are many stone graves, and some species of plants and animals only exist there. Dötlingen was two times Schönstes Dorf Deutschlands, 'the most beautiful village of Germany'. The oak tree in the middle of Dötlingen, next to the old church made of cobble stone, is over 1000 years old. It was struck by lightning and burst, but it survived.

== Twin towns – sister cities ==
- (Netherlands) Leens (De Marne)
