= Hude, Lower Saxony =

Hude
- Municipality
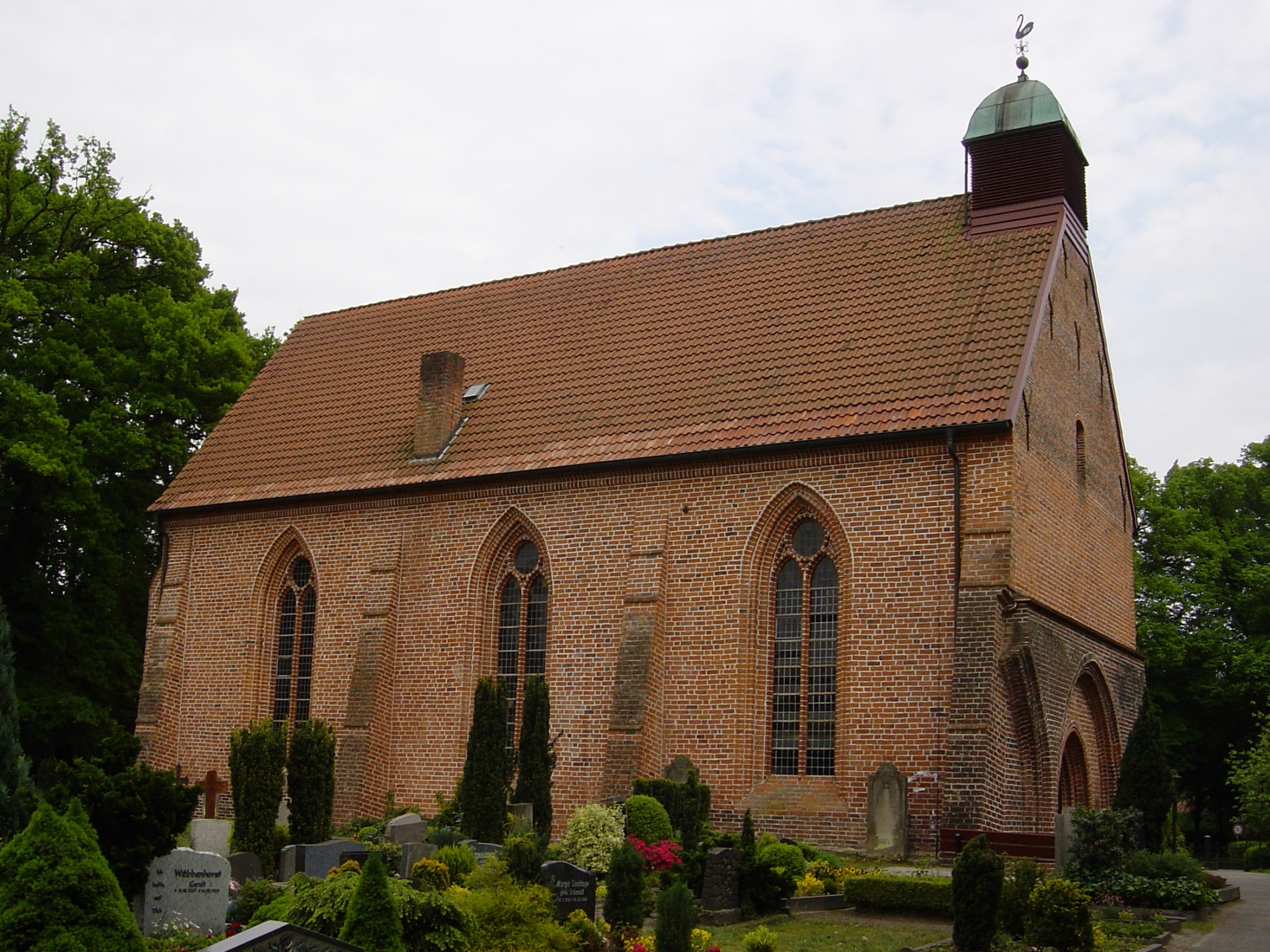
- Lutheran Saint Elizabeth Church

- Coat of arms

- Location of Hude within Oldenburg district
- Interactive map of Hude
- Location within Germany Location within Lower Saxony
- Coordinates: 53°06′40″N 08°27′45″E
- Country: Germany
- State: Lower Saxony
- District: Oldenburg

Government
  - Mayor (2021–26): Jörg Skatulla (SPD)

Area
  - Total: 124.79 km^{2} (48.18 sq mi)
- Elevation: 5 m (16 ft)

Population (2025-12-31)
  - Total: 15,842
  - Density: 126.95/km^{2} (328.80/sq mi)
- Time zone: UTC+01:00 (CET)
  - Summer (DST): UTC+02:00 (CEST)
- Postal codes: 27798
- Dialling codes: 04408, 04484
- Vehicle registration: OL
- Website: www.hude.de

Hude (German pronunciation: [ˈhuːdə]) is a municipality in the district of Oldenburg, in Lower Saxony, Germany. It is situated 15 km east of Oldenburg, and 25 km west of Bremen (centre). The population is approximately 15,000 and approximately one third of these people are retired.

== Transport ==
- Hude railway station
