= Oldenburg (district) =

District in Lower Saxony, Germany

Coordinates: 53°00′N 8°25′E

- District
- Flag Coat of arms
- Country: Germany
- State: Lower Saxony
- Capital: Wildeshausen

Government
  - District admin.: Christian Pundt

Area
  - Total: 1,063 km^{2} (410 sq mi)

Population (31 December 2024)
  - Total: 132,008
  - Density: 124.2/km^{2} (321.6/sq mi)
- Time zone: UTC+01:00 (CET)
  - Summer (DST): UTC+02:00 (CEST)
- Vehicle registration: OL
- Website: oldenburg-kreis.de

The district of Oldenburg (German: Landkreis Oldenburg, not to be confused with the cities of Oldenburg and Oldenburg in Holstein) is a district in the state of Lower Saxony, Germany. It is bounded by (clockwise from the east) the districts of Diepholz, Vechta, Cloppenburg and Ammerland, the city of Oldenburg, the district of Wesermarsch and the city of Delmenhorst.

== History ==
The district of Oldenburg was established in 1933. Until 1988 the administrative seat was located in the city of Oldenburg. Since then the capital has been in Wildeshausen. Until 1993 the official name of the district was Landkreis Oldenburg (Oldenburg), to distinguish it from the former district Oldenburg in Holstein.

== Geography ==
The district is located between the metropolitan areas of Oldenburg and Bremen. The Hunte River runs through the district from south to north.

== Coat of arms ==
The coat of arms displays:

- The red and yellow stripes from the arms of Oldenburg
- The heraldic cross of the county of Delmenhorst
- The roses in the bottom were used in the arms of the counts of Oldenburg

== Towns and municipalities ==
Clickable map of towns and municipalities in the district

Towns
1. Wildeshausen

Free municipalities

1. Dötlingen
2. Ganderkesee
3. Großenkneten
4. Hatten
5. Hude
6. Wardenburg
Samtgemeinden
- 1. Harpstedt
1. Beckeln
2. Colnrade
3. Dünsen
4. Groß Ippener
5. Harpstedt^{1}
6. Kirchseelte
7. Prinzhöfte
8. Winkelsett

^{1}seat of the Samtgemeinde
