= Maschberg =

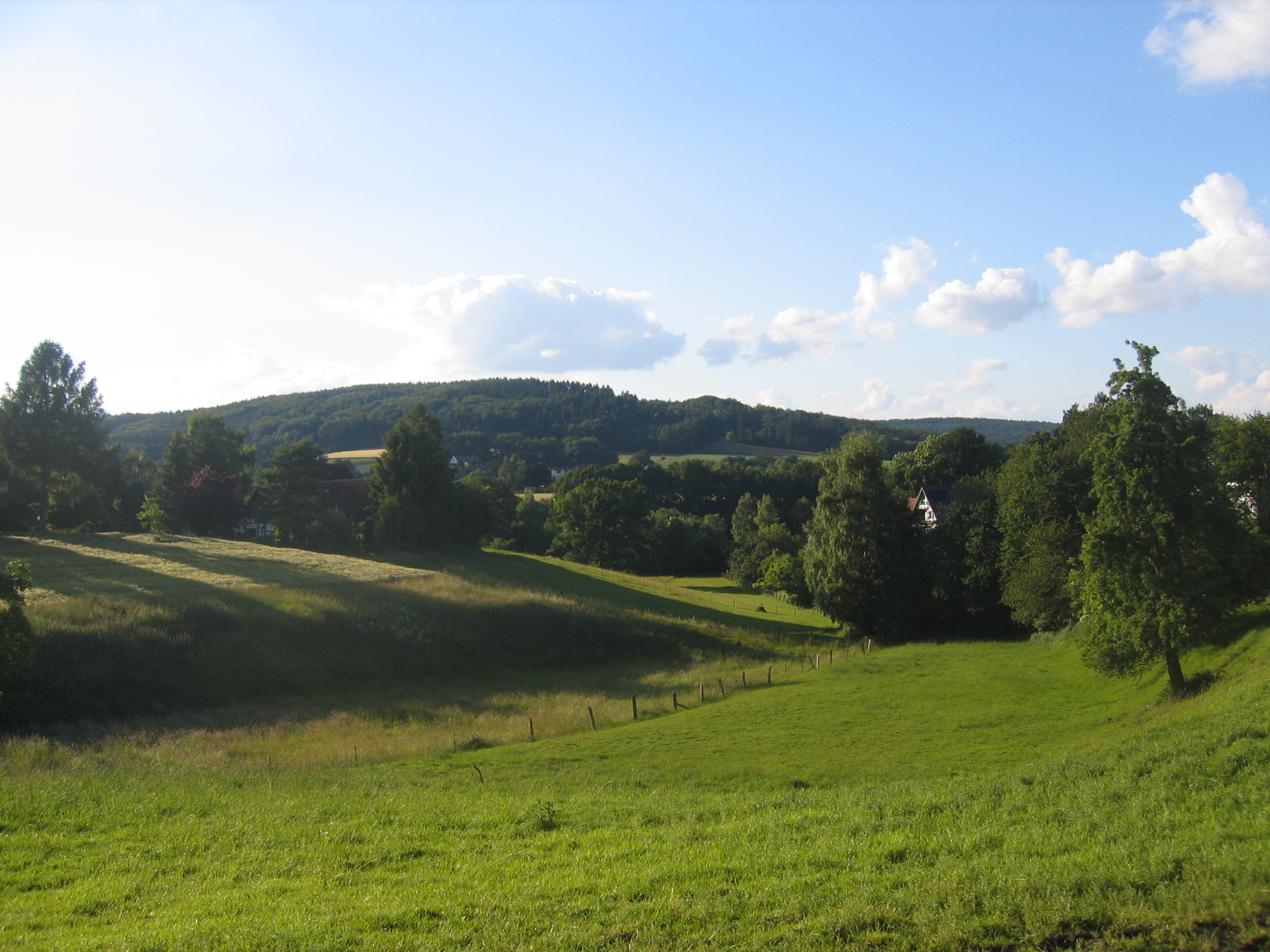
- Maschberg

Highest point
- Elevation: 190.2 m above sea level (NN) (624 ft)
- Coordinates: 52°15′57″N 8°30′10″E

Geography
- Location within North Rhine-Westphalia
- Location: North Rhine-Westphalia, Germany
- Parent range: Wiehen Hills

Geology
- Rock type: Sandstone

The Maschberg is a hill, 190.2 m above sea level (NN), in the Wiehen Hills and on the boundary between the village of Rödinghausen and the town of Preußisch Oldendorf. The Maschberg is the highest point in the Rödinghausen parish of Schwenningdorf.

The Maschberg, like almost all the hills in the Wiehen, has an elongated crest or Egge and is only separated to the hills to the west by dören. As a result, the hill is only perceived as a prominent summit. A long distance path, the Wittekindsweg, runs over the summit. To the west the Wiehen Hills climb again to the Nonnenstein. To the east the range descends into the water gap of the Große Aue to a height of 80 m above NN. Southwest of the summit rises the stream of Wehmerhorster Bach.

The name "Maschberg" refers to the Börninghausen village of Masch (also Mesch), which lies northeast of the hill in the valley of Eggetal.
