= Nordbach =

River in Germany

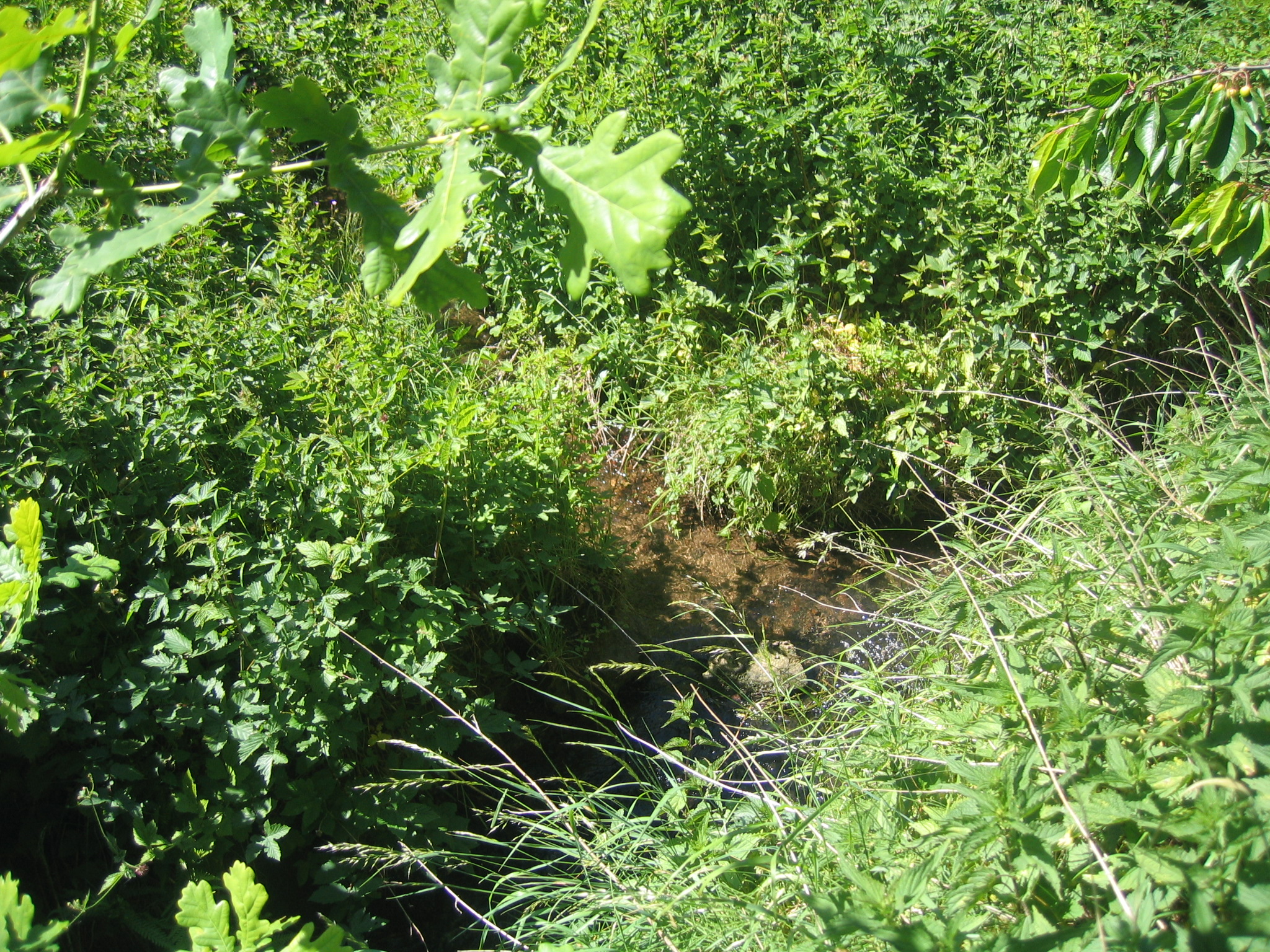
- Mündung des Nordbaches in die Große Aue

Location
- Country: Germany
- State: North Rhine-Westphalia

Physical characteristics
- Source
  - location: In Schwenningdorf
  - coordinates: 52°14′51″N 8°30′23″E
  - elevation: 120 m above sea level (NN)
- Mouth
  - location: In Schwenningdorf into the Große Aue
  - coordinates: 52°15′11″N 8°31′44″E
  - elevation: 91 m above sea level (NN)
- Length: 1.7 km (1.1 mi)
- Basin size: <10 km²

Basin features
- Progression: Große Aue→ Weser→ North Sea
- Landmarks: Villages: Rödinghausen

The Nordbach is a 1.7 kilometre long, left tributary of the Große Aue in East Westphalian Rödinghausen in the district of Herford in the German state of North Rhine-Westphalia

The Nordbach stream rises at a height of 120 m above sea level (NN) in Schwenningdorf. It discharges into the Große Aue, or Neuer Mühlenbach as it is known in its upper reaches, at a point 82.7 kilometres up the Aue from its mouth. Their confluence is at 91 m above NN and the stream descends a total of 29 metres.

== Swimming pool ==
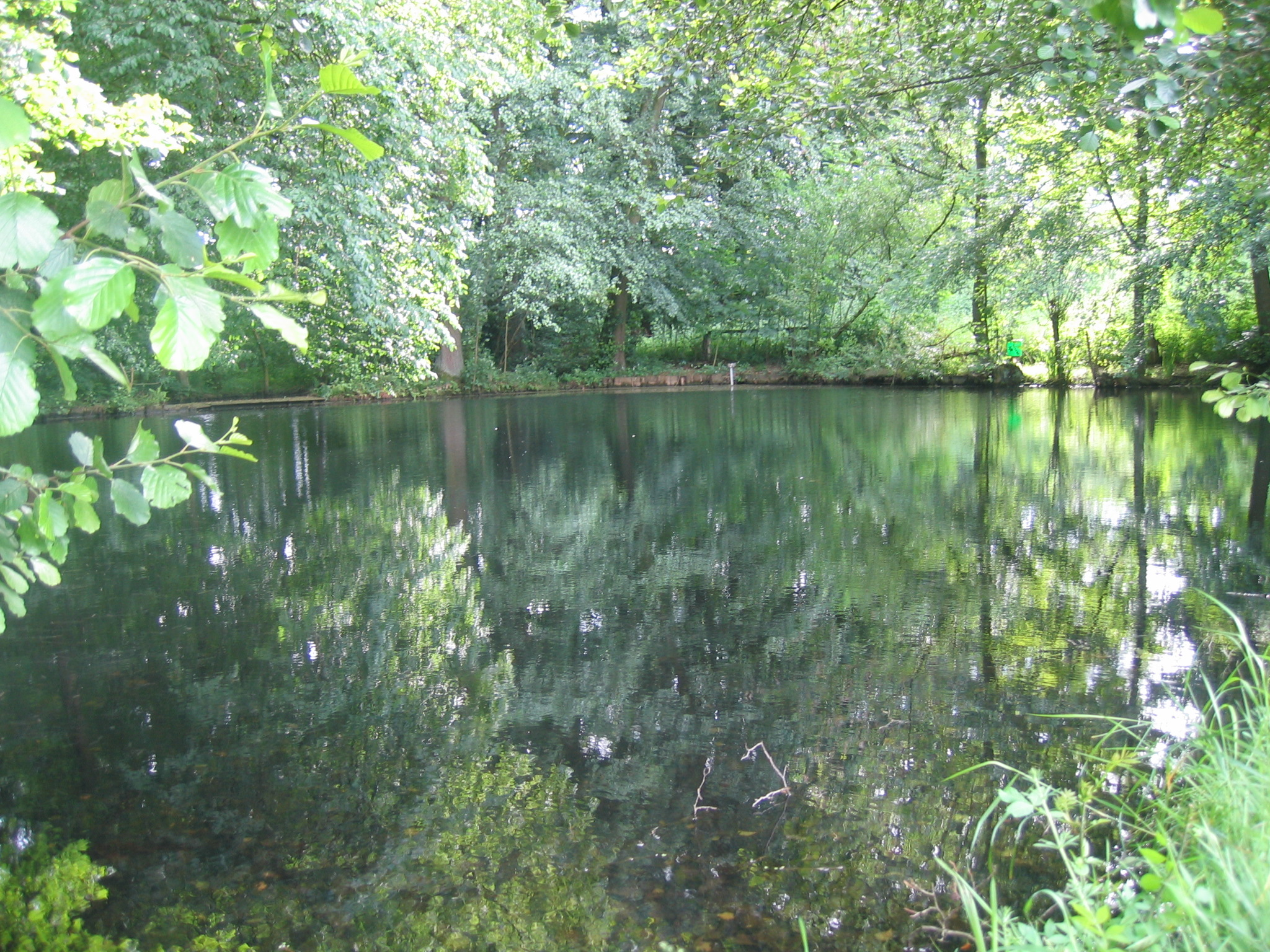
Old open-air pool

The Nordbach fed the first natural open-air pool in the parish of Rödinghausen. Its basin is used as a fish pond today.
