= Klosterbach (Große Aue) =

River in Germany

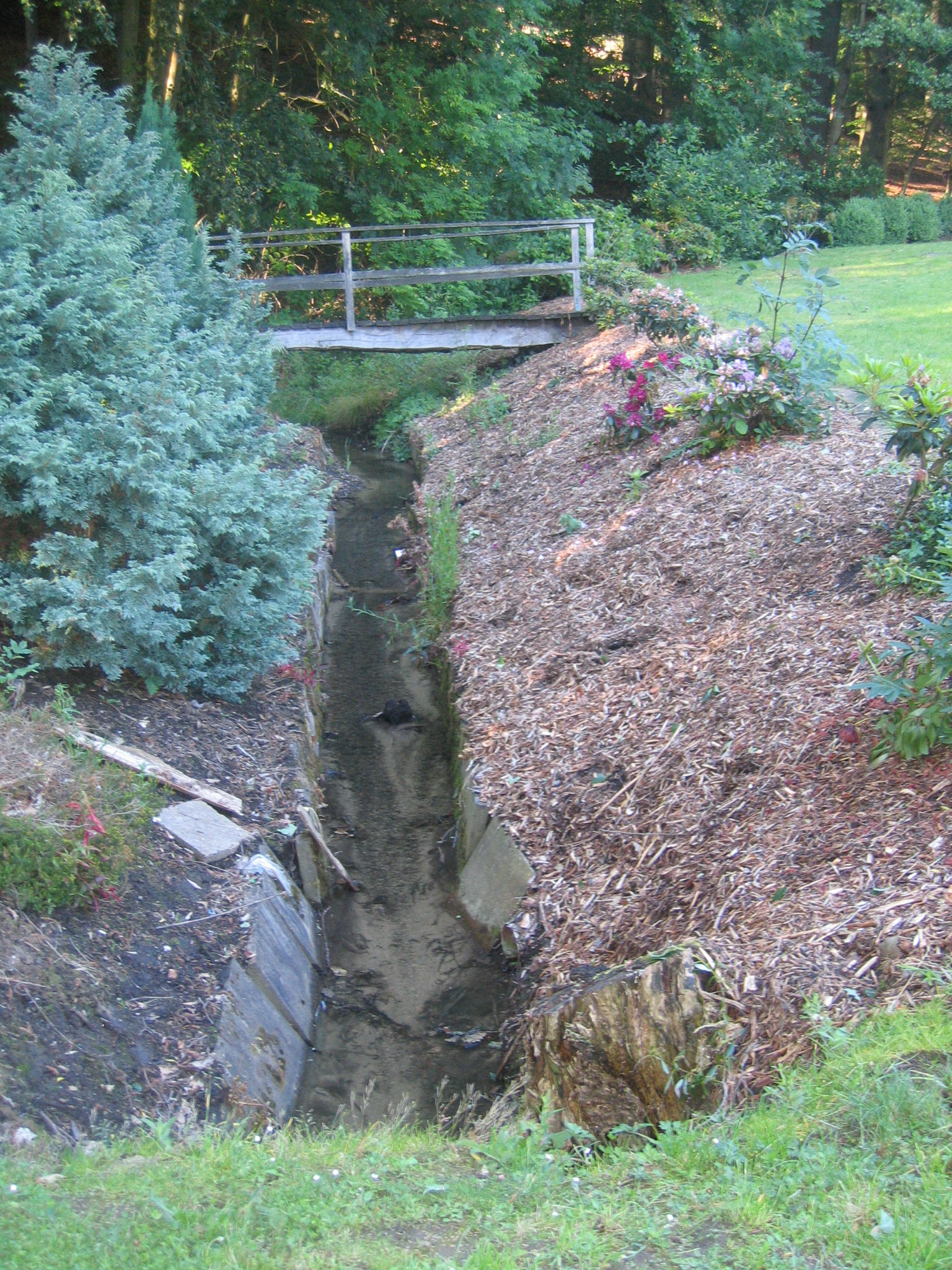
- The Klosterbach in a private garten - quasi-canalised here for around 10m.

Location
- Country: Germany
- State: North Rhine-Westphalia

Physical characteristics
- Source
  - location: In Bieren
  - coordinates: 52°15′26″N 8°32′41″E
  - elevation: 152 m above sea level (NN)
- Mouth
  - location: near Schwenningdorf-Neue Mühle into the Große Aue
  - coordinates: 52°15′6″N 8°31′44″E
  - elevation: 94 m above sea level (NN)
- Length: 1.6 km (0.99 mi)
- Basin size: <10 km²

Basin features
- Progression: Große Aue→ Weser→ North Sea
- Landmarks: Villages: Rödinghausen
- Population: 250

The Klosterbach is a right-hand tributary of the Große Aue, which is known as the Neuer Mühlenbach at the point where they join, in north Germany. The Klosterbach lies entirely within the parish of Rödinghausen in the district of Herford, North Rhine-Westphalia.

The Klosterbach emerges north of Bieren near the Donoer Berg on the southern edge of the Wiehen Hills at a height of 152 m above sea level (NN). The stream discharges into the Große Aue after 1.6 kilometres at a height of 94 m above NN at river kilometre 82.9 on the Aue. The Klosterbach descends a height of 58 metres.

== See also ==
- List of rivers in Ostwestfalen-Lippe
