= Schierenbeck (surname) =

Schierenbeck is a German surname.

== People with the surname ==
- Björn Schierenbeck (born 1974), German former professional footballer
- Peggy Schierenbeck (born 1970), German politician

== See also ==
- Schierenbeke
- Schmerenbeck Educational Centre for Gifted and Talented Children
