= Nonnenstein =

Hill in Germany

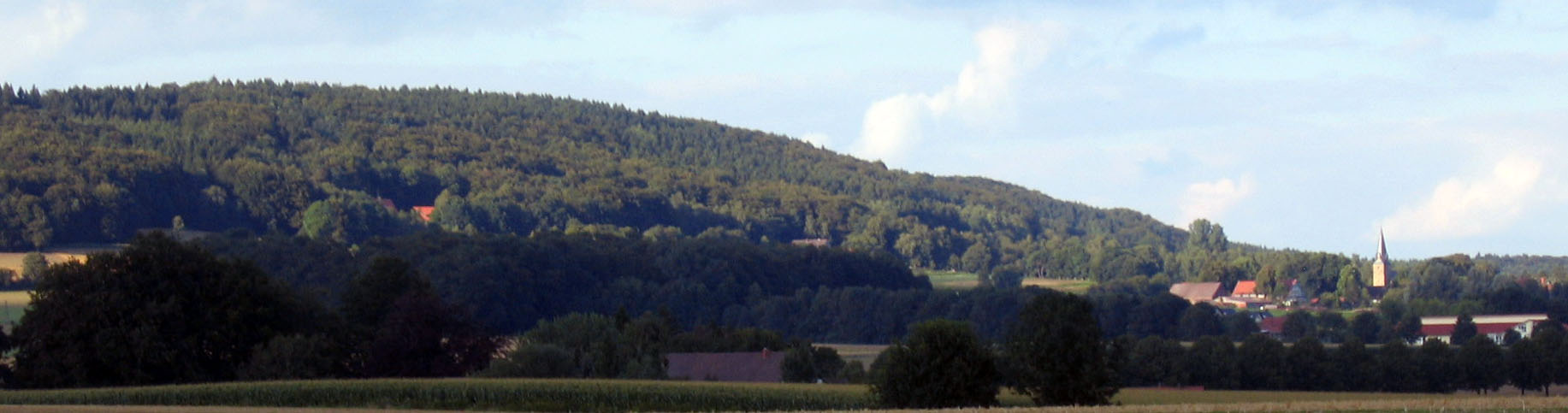
- View of the Nonnenstein and Rödinghausen from the SW

Highest point
- Elevation: 274 m above sea level (NHN) (899 ft)
- Listing: Nonnenstein Tower, Bismarck Beacon
- Coordinates: 52°15′43.25″N 8°28′45.7″E

Geography
- Location within North Rhine-Westphalia
- Location: Rödinghausen/Preußisch Oldendorf, North Rhine-Westphalia, Germany
- Parent range: Wiehen Hills

Geology
- Rock type: Sandstein

The Nonnenstein is a hill, 274 m above sea level (NHN), in the Wiehen Hills north of Rödinghausen, Germany. The Nonnenstein is also known in older literature as the Rödinghauser Berg.

== Height ==
There is a curiosity about the height of the mountain: due to a measurement or transmission error it was assumed until the 1960s that the Nonnenstein was 325 metres high and thus the highest mountain in the long ridge of the Wiehen Hills. In older lexical works at the beginning of the 20th century, i.e. well within the period when surveying was able to provide accurate values, and the height of other mountains such as the Zugspitze were already determined to the nearest metre, it was even given a height of 336 metres. In fact, however, the Nonnenstein is only 274 metres high, i.e. 51 to 62 metres lower than had previously been assumed, and also visibly lower than the Heidbrink (319.6 m). Nevertheless, the Nonnenstein is still the highest point of the Wiehen Hills in the district of Herford.

== Viewing tower ==
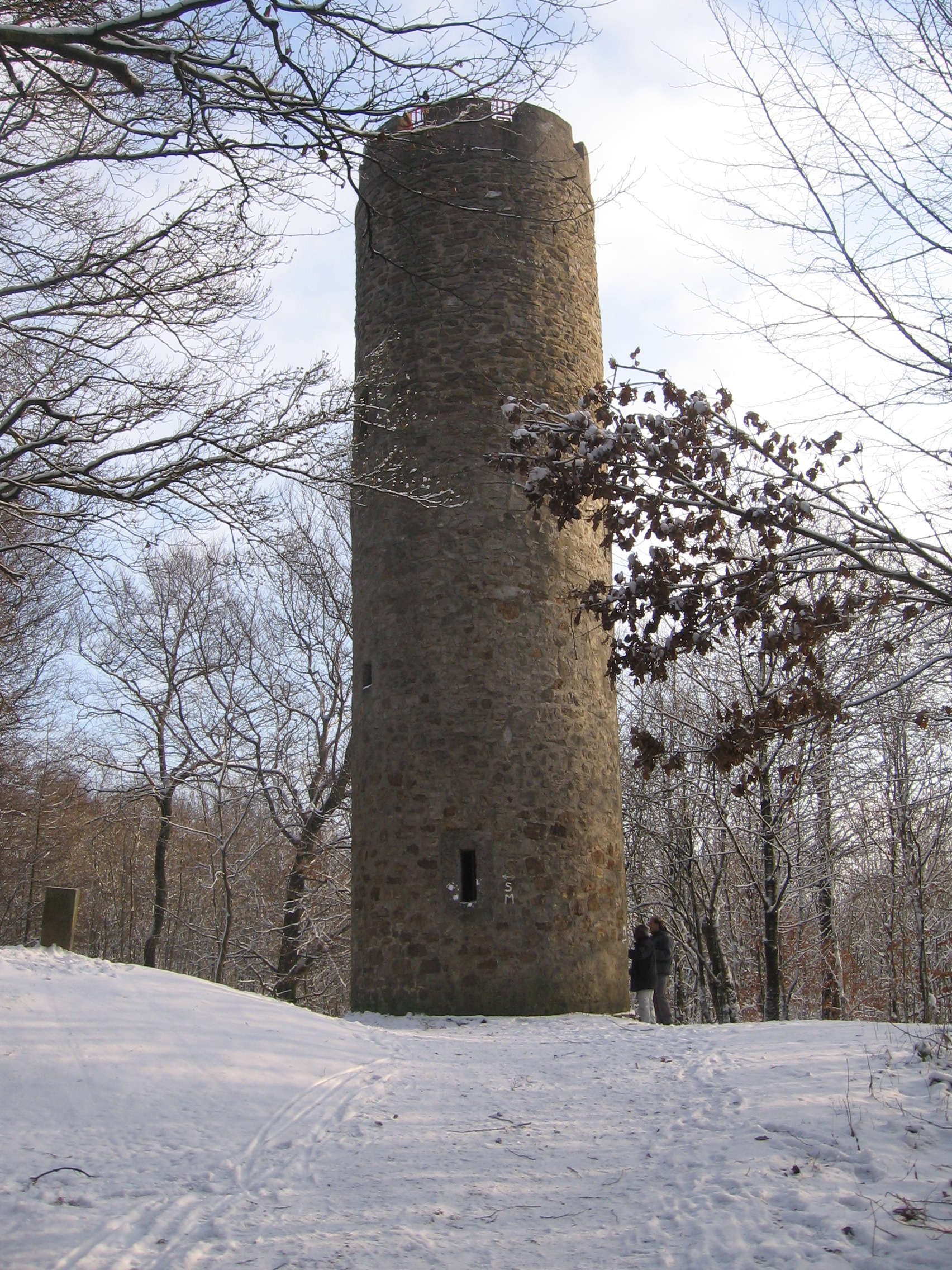
The viewing tower on the Nonnenstein

Nonnenstein is also the name of a 14-metre-high observation tower on the hill (officially: Aussichtsturm auf dem Nonnenstein or "Viewing Tower on the Nonnenstein"). The tower was erected in 1897 as an Emperor William Tower. The Nonnenstein lies exactly on the boundary between the counties of Minden-Lübbecke and Herford. Originally it was lower; at the end of the 20th century the tower was raised in height due to the increased height of the trees. There is a stylised depiction of the observation tower on the Nonnenstein on the coat of arms of Rödinghausen.

According to legend, the tower owes its name to a beautiful damsel named Hildburga, the daughter of the knight whose castle stood on the hill. To the displeasure of her father, the young lady fell in love with a poor knight, the Lord of Limberg, and so her father organized a tournament: the knight who won was allowed to ask for her hand. And so it happened that, in the final of the tournament, the girl's father and the Lord of Limberg faced one another. They collided with their horses and lances so hard that they skewered one another and died.

After this tragedy, Hildburga vowed to become a nun and turned her father's castle into a monastery. After her death, the nuns ruled there in such a cold and merciless manner that the impoverished peasants of the vicinity stormed the castle, destroying it except for a single tower and the foundation stone. Hence the name "Nonnenstein". In the vernacular, the name of the hill has been transferred to the viewing tower. From the upper platform, you can see as far as the Hermannsdenkmal in Lippe when the weather is good and the view is clear.

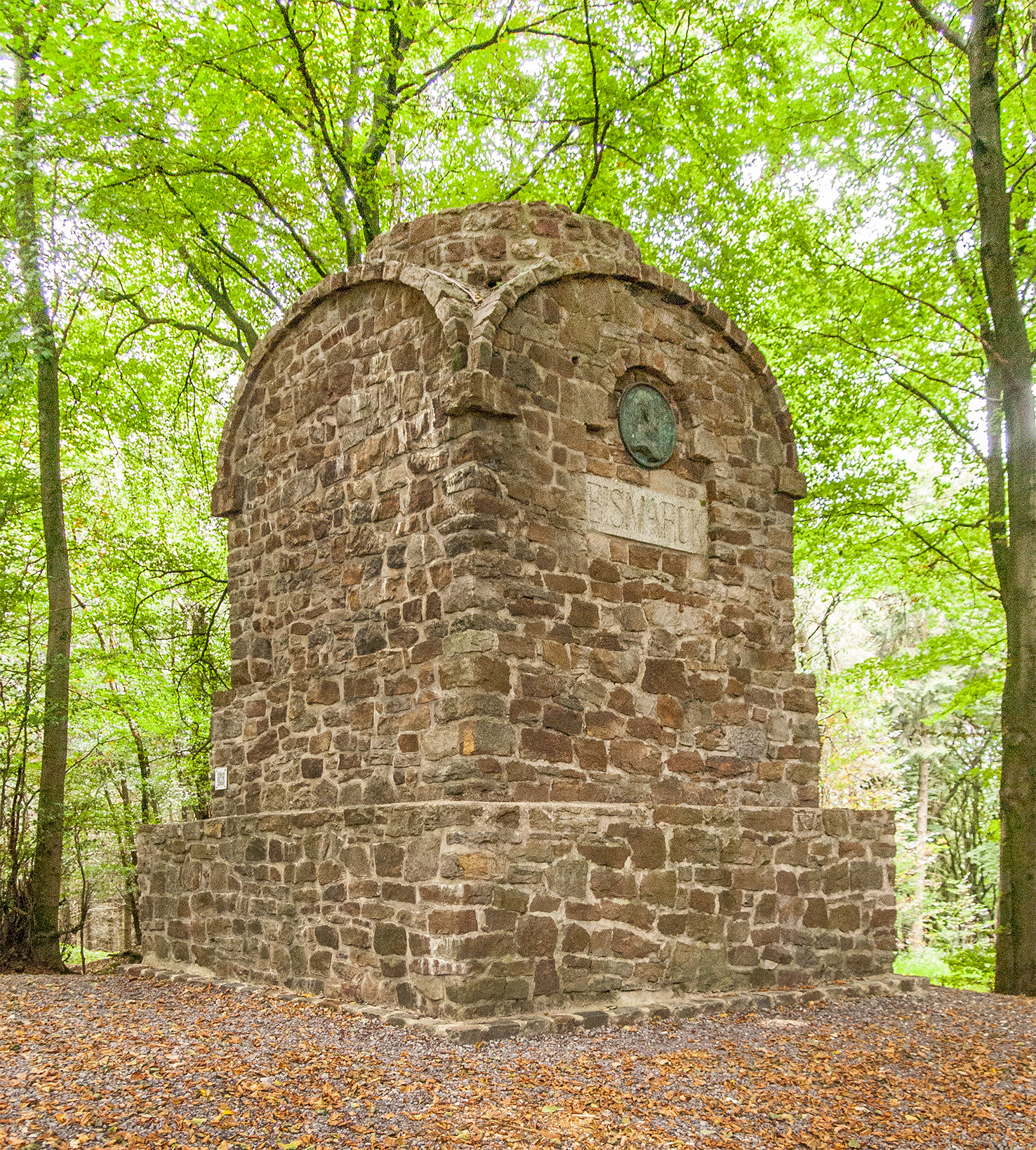
Bismarck Beacon

A hundred metres from the tower, the Bismarck Beacon (Bismarck-Feuersäule) was built in 1911 on the initiative of the Bünde Fitness Club (Turnvereins Bünde) and Bismarck supporters from Rödinghausen. It is a six-metre-high sandstone column with a square ground plan and a Bismarck medallion at the front.

The hill and its tower are on the course of the Wittekindsweg, part of the E11 European long distance path.

In Saxon Switzerland near Dresden there is a rock called the Burgwarte Nonnenstein.
