= Sule (river) =

River in Germany

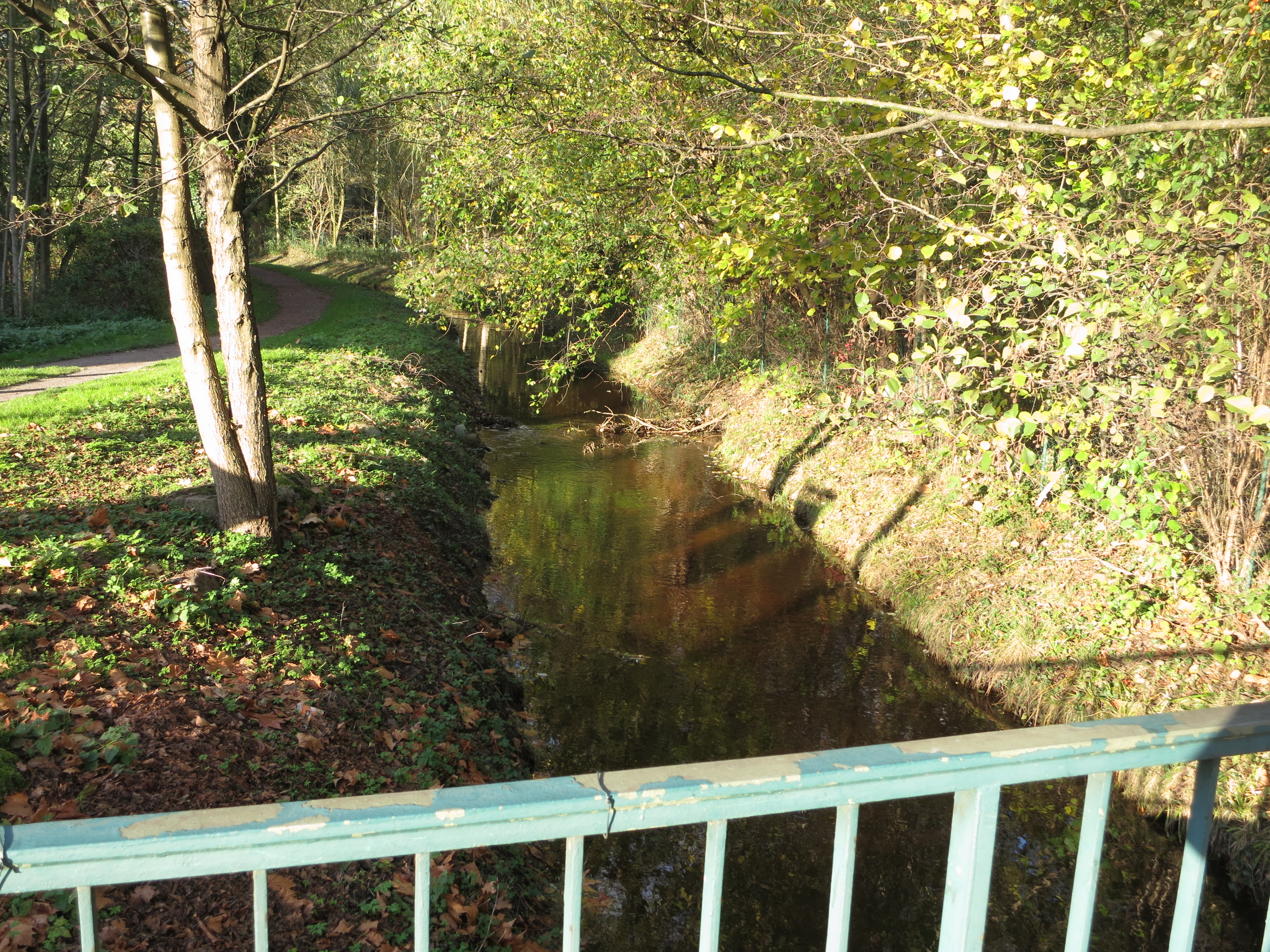
- The Sule in Sulingen above the mill Lünings Mühle

Location
- Country: Germany
- State: Lower Saxony

Physical characteristics
- Source
  - location: In Blockwinkel, parish of Scholen
  - coordinates: 52°45′29″N 8°46′00″E
  - elevation: 55 m above sea level (NN)
- Mouth
  - location: East of Barenburg
  - coordinates: 52°37′09″N 8°50′36″E
  - elevation: 30 m above sea level (NN)
- Length: 18.6 km (11.6 mi)

Basin features
- Progression: Große Aue→ Weser→ North Sea

Sule is a river of Lower Saxony, Germany, a tributary of the Große Aue.

The Sule belongs to the Weser river system. With a length of about 16 kilometres (9.9 mi) it flows exclusively through the district of Diepholz. It rises north of Scholen, flows in a southerly direction through the villages of Schwaförden, Sulingen, Kirchdorf, and discharges into the Große Aue near Barenburg.

== See also ==
- List of rivers of Lower Saxony
