= Kleine Aue (Barenburg) =

River in Germany

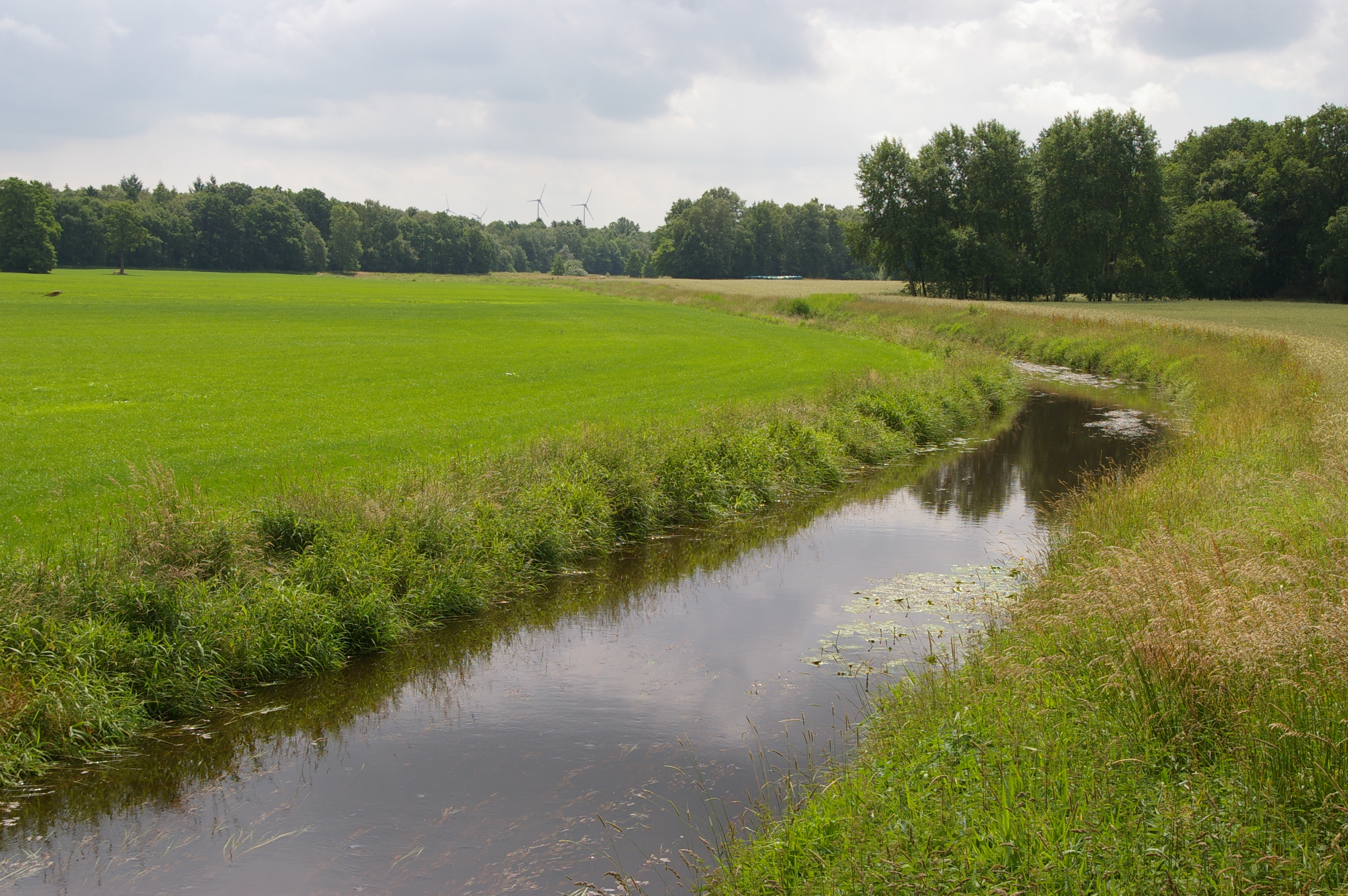

Location
- Country: Germany
- State: Lower Saxony
- District: Diepholz

Physical characteristics
- Source
  - location: in the Geestmoor near Scholen-Blockwinkel
  - coordinates: 52°45′25″N 8°45′04″E
  - elevation: 50 m
- Mouth
  - location: at Barenburg into the Große Aue
  - coordinates: 52°36′56″N 8°47′42″E
  - elevation: 33 m
- Length: 17.7 km (11.0 mi)
- Basin size: 107.32 km^{2} (41.44 sq mi)
- Discharge
  - location: Barenburg

Basin features
- Progression: Große Aue→ Weser→ North Sea
- Tributaries
  - right: Kuhbach

The Kleine Aue ("Little Aue") is a river of Lower Saxony, Germany. It discharges into the Große Aue ("Great Aue") from the left in Barenburg.

It is the lower one of two homonymous tributaries of that affluent of River Weser. It has a length of 18.2 kilometres (11.3 mi). Its entire course is lying in the district of Diepholz in the federal state of Lower Saxony.

== Course ==
The river rises southwest of Scholen, flows in a southerly direction through Schwaförden, west of the town of Sulingen and is joined by the Kuhbach stream. It then continues through Kirchdorf and discharges into the Große Aue at Barenburg.

== See also ==
- List of rivers of Lower Saxony
