= Rahden station =

Railway station in Rahden, Germany

Rahden
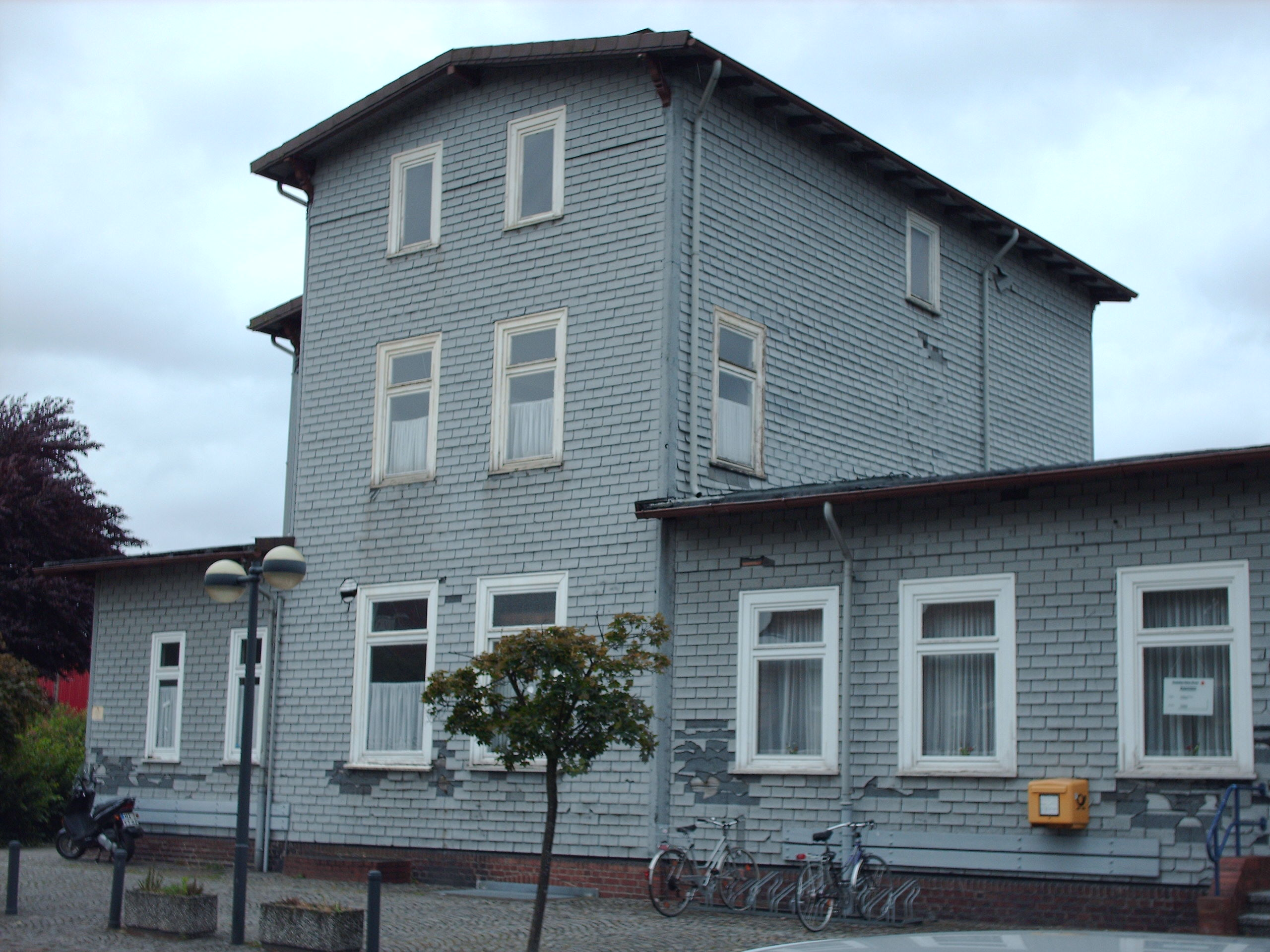

General information
- Location: Bünde, NRW; Germany
- Coordinates: 52°25′59″N 8°37′26″E
- Lines: Rahden–Herford (KBS 386); Rahden–Uchte (Museum railway); Rahden–Ströhen (Han) (Draisine operations)
- Platforms: 2 (track 2 serves museum railway)

Construction
- Accessible: Yes

Other information
- Station code: 5099
- DS100 code: HRAH
- Category: 6
- Fare zone: Westfalentarif: 64001
- Website: www.bahnhof.de

History
- Opened: 1 October 1899

Services
Preceding station		Following station
Terminus	RB 71	Espelkamp towards Bielefeld Hbf
Location

Rahden station is the northernmost station in the German state of North Rhine-Westphalia in the town of Rahden in the Kreis (district) of Minden-Lübbecke. It is located at the northern end of the remaining section of the branch line from Bünde (where there is a connection to the Löhne–Rheine railway), with a connection to Herford station on the Hamm–Minden railway.

== History ==
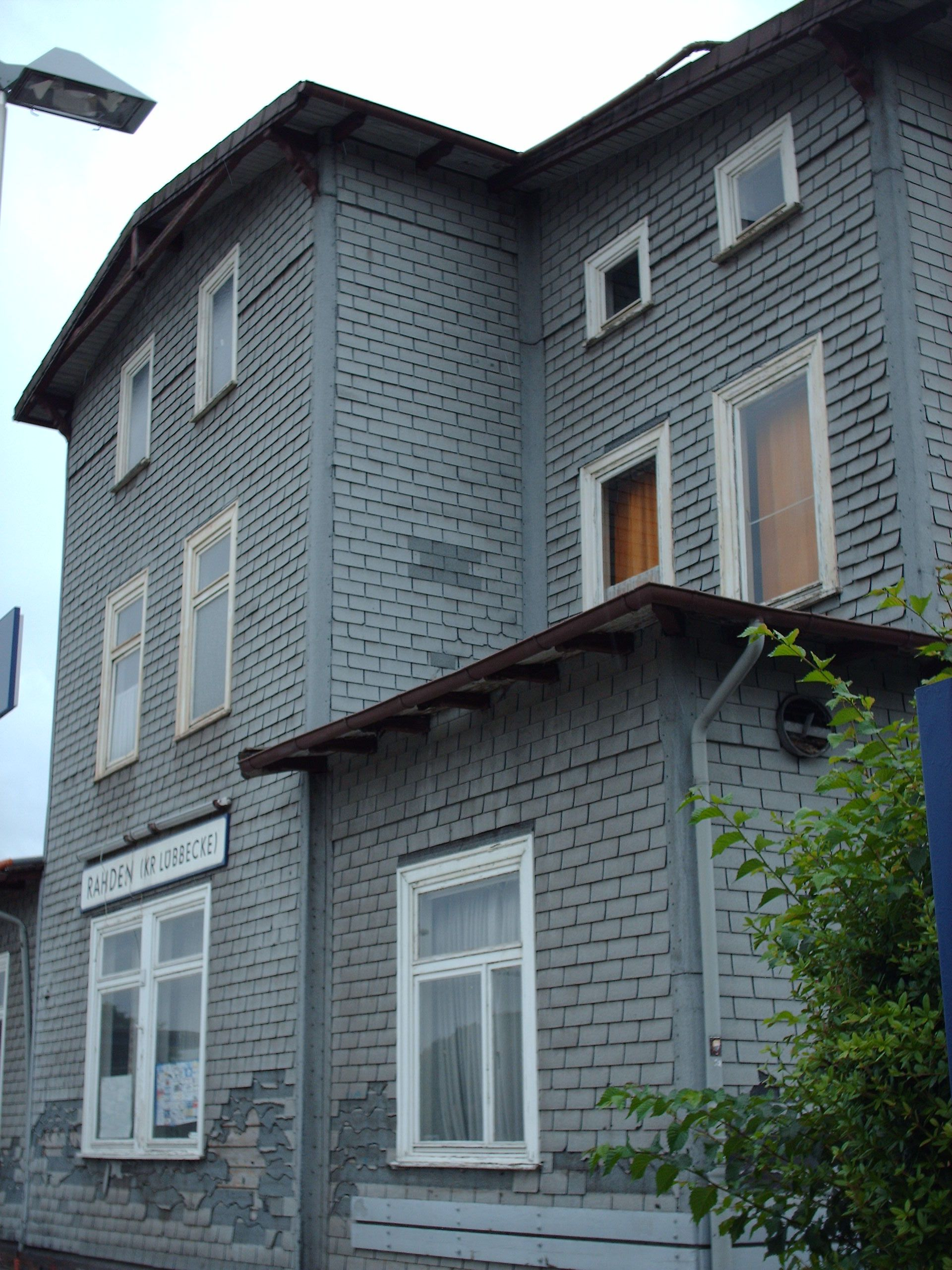
The entrance building seen from platform side

Rahden station was opened on 1 October 1899 at the end point of the railway line from Bünde, which was opened at the same time. Exactly one year later, another section was opened to Sulingen and the remainder of the line to Bassum was taken into operation. On 15 January 1910 this was followed by the opening of the line to Nienburg.

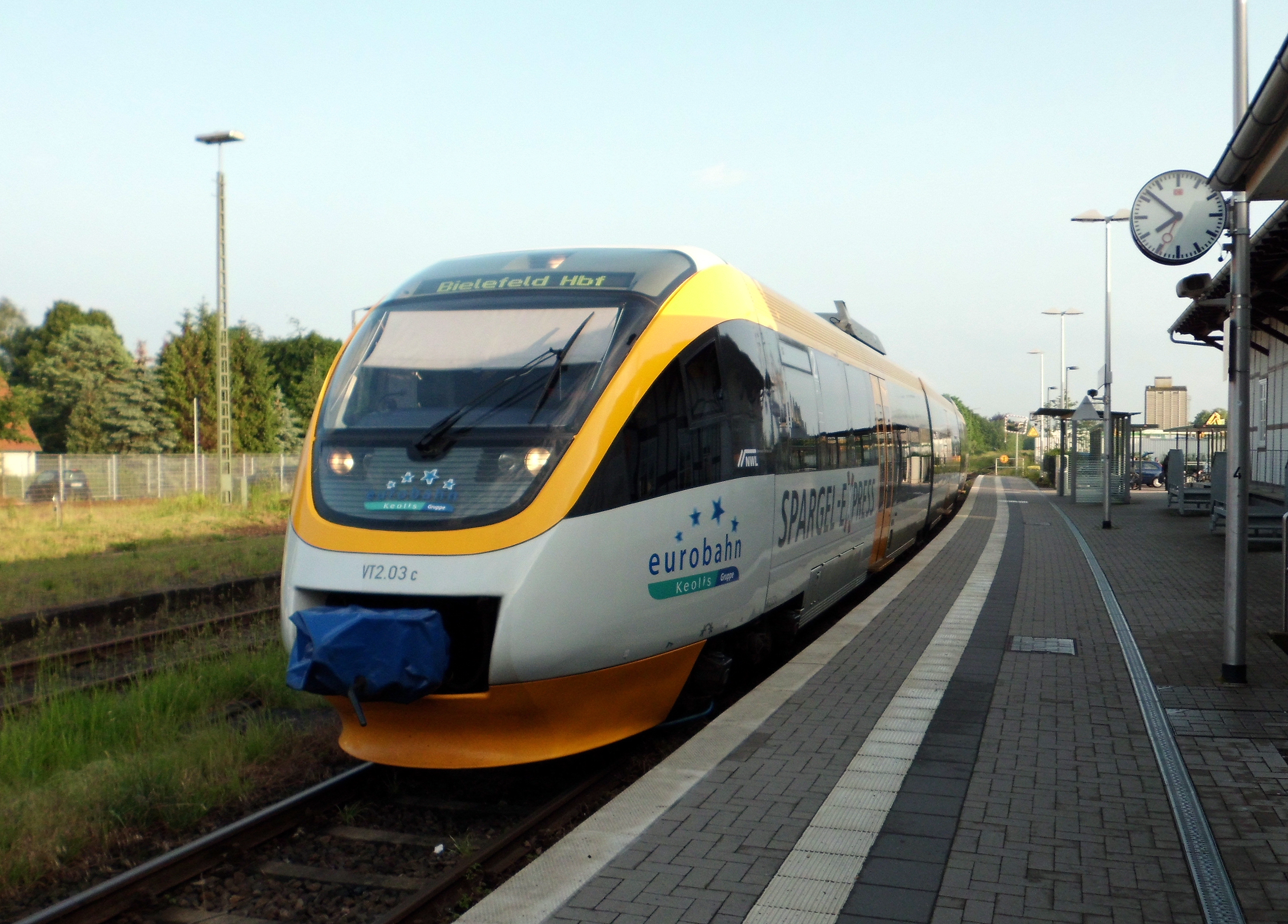
Eurobahn-Talent on the platform in Rahden

Passenger services to Nienburg were abandoned on 29 September 1968 and the section between Uchte and Nienburg was closed at the end of 1996.

Passenger services to Bassum were abandoned on 27 May 1994. This was followed by the closing of freight traffic on the section between Rahden and Barenburg on 1 September 1995 before this section of the line was closed at the end of 1997.

== Location ==
Rahden station is located on the eastern edge of the town centre. It is located on the railway that formerly ran between Bassum and Herford, which is also called the Ravensberg Railway (Ravensberger Bahn). This now runs from Rahden via Bassum to Herford on the Hamm–Minden Railway.

Since Easter 2009 Auenland-Draisinen GmbH has operated a draisine service on a disused section of the line from Rahden to Ströhen.

The Museumseisenbahn Rahden-Uchte operates steam excursions on the former Nienburg–Rahden railway from the station during the summer months.

== Rail services ==
Rahden station is served by a Regionalbahn service (RB71), which is operated by Eurobahn with modern Bombardier Talent diesel railcars.

Line	Line name	Route	Frequency	Operator
RB 71	Ravensberger Bahn	Rahden – Bünde – Herford – Bielefeld	60 min (Mon–Sat); 120 min (Sun)	Eurobahn
