= Kuhbach (Sulingen) =

River in Lower Saxony, Germany

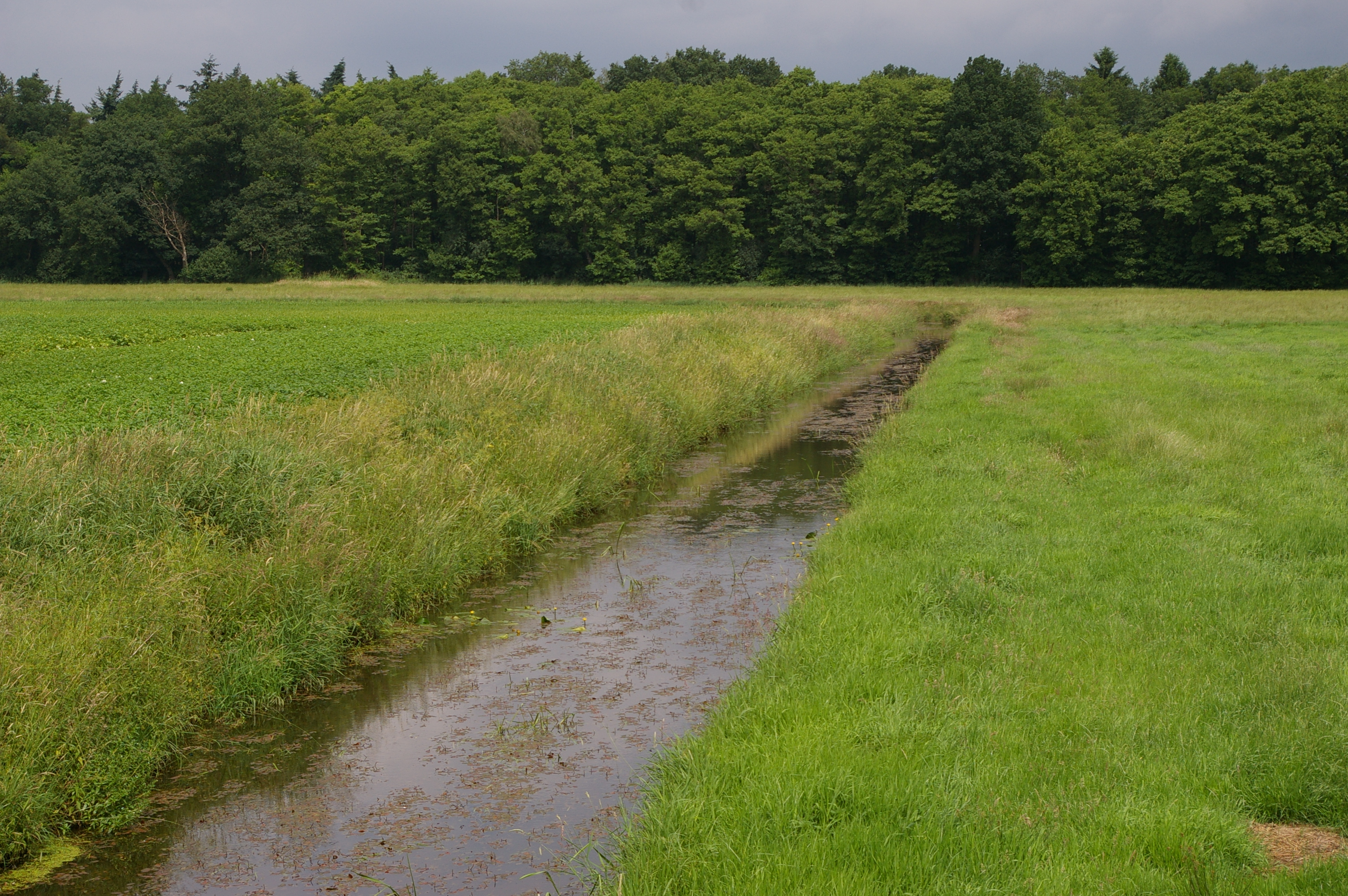
- the Kuhbach near Rathlosen

Location
- Country: Germany
- State: Lower Saxony

Physical characteristics
- Mouth
  - location: Kleine Aue
  - coordinates: 52.6820°N 8.7496°E
- Length: 17.4 km (10.8 mi)

Basin features
- Progression: Kleine Aue→ Große Aue→ Weser→ North Sea

Kuhbach is a river of Lower Saxony, Germany. It flows into the Kleine Aue near Sulingen.

== See also ==
- List of rivers of Lower Saxony
