= Allerbeeke =

River in Germany

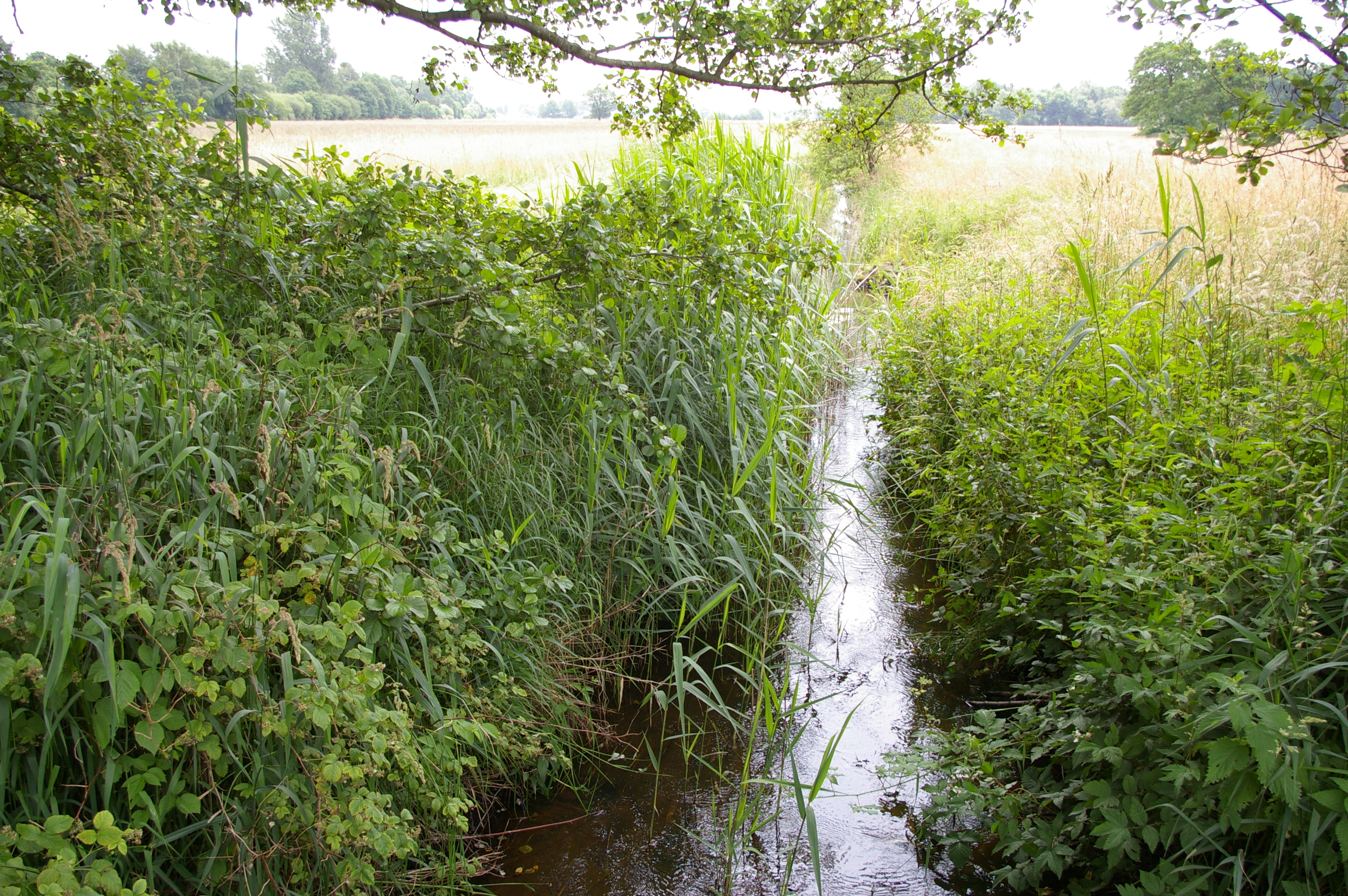

- Location of mouth in Lower Saxony

Location
- Country: Germany
- State: Lower Saxony

Physical characteristics
- Mouth
  - location: Große Aue
  - coordinates: 52.6103°N 8.8756°E
- Length: 13.7 km (8.5 mi)

Basin features
- Progression: Große Aue→ Weser→ North Sea

The Allerbeeke is a stream of Lower Saxony, Germany. It belongs to the Weser river system in north Germany. With a length of about 14 kilometres (8.7 mi) it flows through the district of Diepholz. It rises northeast of the town centre of Sulingen, flows in a southerly direction forming the boundary between Sulingen and Maasen (Siedenburg) and discharges east of Barenburg into the Große Aue.

== See also ==
- List of rivers of Lower Saxony
