= Wehmerhorster Bach =

River in Germany

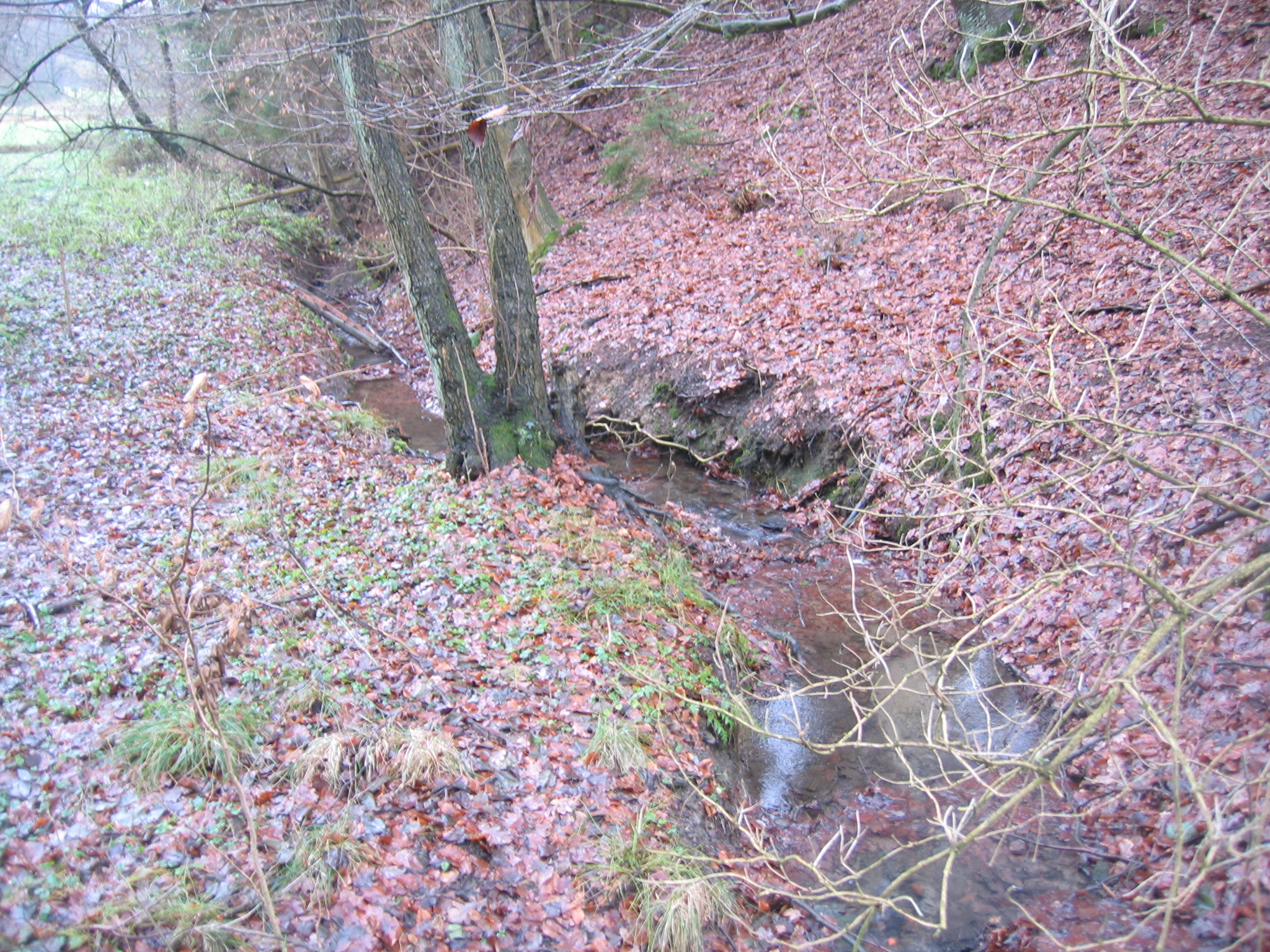

Location
- Country: Germany
- State: North Rhine-Westphalia

Physical characteristics
- Mouth
  - location: Schierenbeke
  - coordinates: 52.2575°N 8.5158°E

Basin features
- Progression: Schierenbeke→ Große Aue→ Weser→ North Sea

The Wehmerhorster Bach is a stream in North Rhine-Westphalia, Germany which rises on the Maschberg. It is 1.5 km (0.9 mi) long and flows into the Schierenbeke as a left tributary near Rödinghausen.

== See also ==
- List of rivers of North Rhine-Westphalia
