= Große Aue =

River in Germany

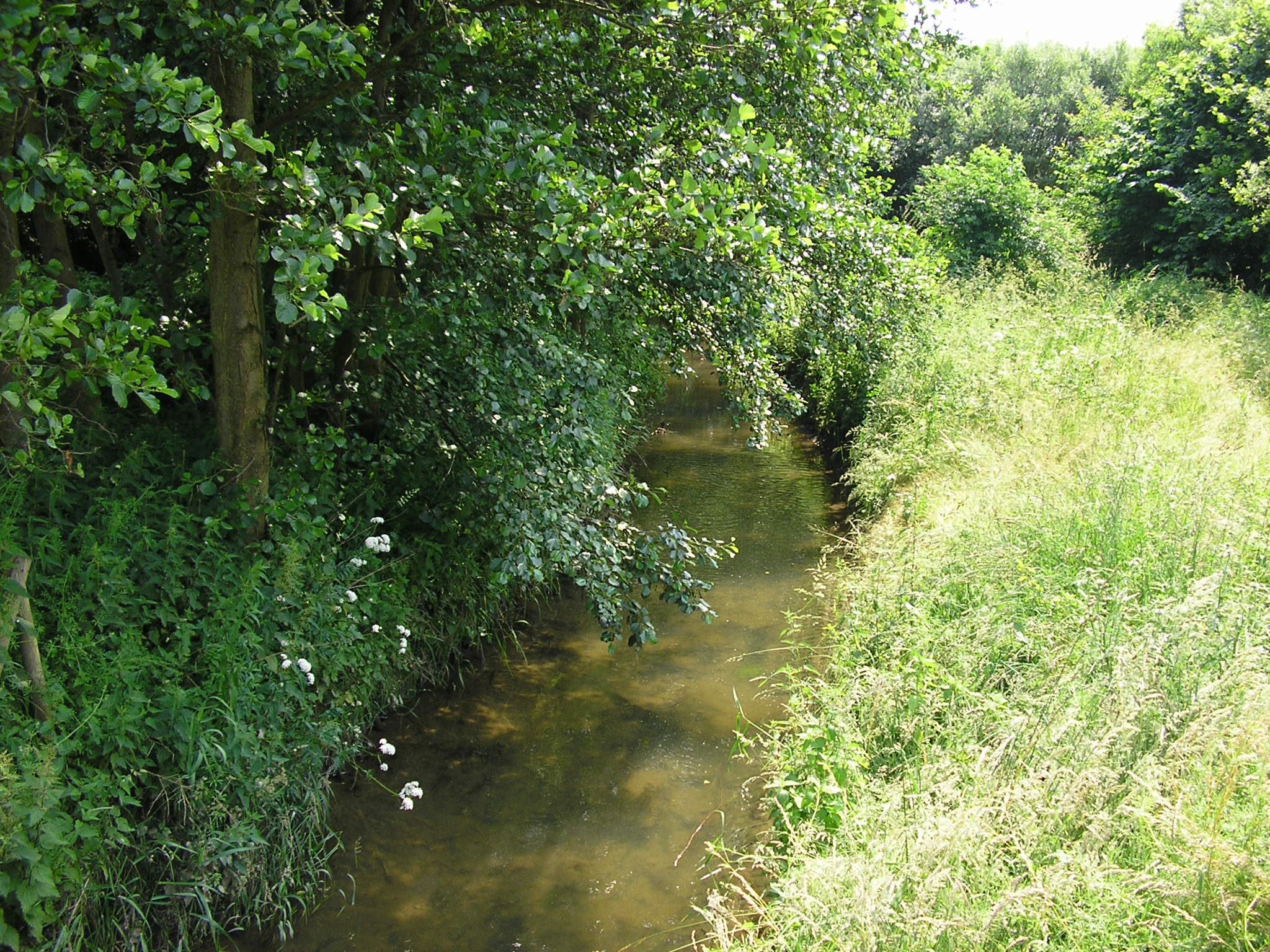
- The 'young' Große Aue in its upper course forms the boundary of the towns Lübbecke and Preußisch Oldendorf here for about a kilometre

Location
- Country: Germany
- States: North Rhine-Westphalia and Lower Saxony
- Reference no.: DE: 476

Physical characteristics
- Source
  - location: northeast of Bieren
  - coordinates: 52°14′50″N 8°32′40″E
  - elevation: 130 m above sea level (NN)
- Mouth
  - location: near Binnen into the Weser
  - coordinates: 52°37′22″N 9°9′49″E
  - elevation: 22 m above sea level (NN)
- Length: 88.0 km (54.7 mi)
- Basin size: 1,522 km^{2} (588 sq mi) (458 km² in NRW)

Basin features
- Progression: Weser→ North Sea
- Landmarks: Large towns: Lübbecke, Espelkamp; Small towns: Preußisch Oldendorf, Rahden; Villages: Schwenningdorf, Bad Holzhausen, Preußisch Ströhen, Barenburg, Steyerberg, Liebenau, Binnen
- Tributaries
  - left: Nordbach, Schierenbeke, Großer Dieckfluss, Ströher Graben, Bleckriede, Flöte, Kleine Aue, Sule, Allerbeeke, Siede, Peekriede, Winterbach
  - right: Klosterbach, Flöthe, Kleine Aue, Wickriede, Langer Graben, Herrenriede, Rüsselbach, Sarninghäuser Meerbach, Langhorst Kuhlengraben
- Waterbodies: Lakes: Großer Auesee

The Große Aue (German pronunciation: [ˈɡʁoːsə ˈaʊə]; in its upper reaches known as the Aue and then also the Neuer Mühlenbach or Mühlbach) is an 88-kilometre-long (55 mi), southwestern, left tributary of the River Weser in northern North Rhine-Westphalia and central Lower Saxony in Germany.

== Course ==
The Große Aue rises at a height of 130 m above sea level (NN) as the Aue on the southern side of the Wiehen Hills in the village of Dono in the parish of Rödinghausen in North Rhine-Westphalia. After one and a half kilometres it turns north and from its confluence with the Nordbach, which joins it from the west at Schwenningdorf, is known as the Große Aue. It crosses a water gap in the Wiehen Hills, losing 40 metres of height and powering two mills, so that in the section through the Wiehen crest it has been named the Neuer Mühlbach ("New Mill Stream") after the Neue Mühle ("New Mill") at Schwenningdorf. Further downstream near Fiegenburg it collects a tributary from the west which drains the entire Egge valley (Eggetal), and is then known as the Mühlbach ("Mill Stream"), powering the mill at Gut Grollage, east of the Egge in front of the main crest of the Wiehen Hills. At Bad Holzhausen it loses the name Mühlenbach. Here the Große Aue reaches the North German Plain. At 10.6 kilometres it passes under the Mittelland Canal. On the western edge of Espelkamp (65 kilometres) in the river meadows on the far side of the dyke, two small lakes have been laid out: the Großer Auesee and the See am Kleihügel. The river continues north, passing Rahden to the west, to Preußisch Ströhen (northernmost village in Rahden borough), here it picks up the waters of the Großer Dieckfluss, before crossing the border into Lower Saxony. Here the valley is part of the 'bog belt' (Moorgürtel). Between kilometres 62.8 and 58.8 the Großer Aue flows in two parallel channels, of which one has been straightened, the other is the first part of a renaturalised route. Through Wagenfeld-Ströhen the Großer Aue runs to Barenburg. It flows eastwards through the southern part of the Sulingen Gap and is then forced south by the geest hills of the Steyerberg Forest. Beyond Steyerberg it turns towards the northeast and reaches after a few kilometres the Weser Depression, on whose western edge it flows through Liebenau, in order five kilometres later near Binnen, halfway to Nienburg, discharging into the River Weser. Its total length is about 85 kilometres (53 mi).

== Renaturalisation ==
After everything had been done in the years after the Second World War to turn the Große Aue into a canal-like river and thereby to create a flood-free river channel, initiatives during the 1980s in the Minden-Lübbecke region led to the decision to renaturalise the landscape. The intent was to enable the area, which had lost many of its native plant and animal species, to recover. A habitat was to be created to support riparian woods, hedges and plants and animals typical of the area.

When the first cut of the spade for the renaturalisation took place in 1989 this project was unique in North Rhine-Westphalia. The monotonous river bed and riverside strips of land up to 300 m wide were turned into near-natural pastureland again. About 200 hectares (490 acres) of flood plain was created. The artificial water channel was largely retained, but parallel to it a new river course was laid out which ran along the old route in several places. Today it is clear that a rich animal and plant world has been created without the risk of major flooding.

== Fauna and flora ==
A valuable habitat has been generated on the Große Aue for plants and animals typical of water meadows. In the wet biotopes and in the standing and flowing waters there are grass rushes, water violets and blister sedges as well as short-winged coneheads and large marsh grasshoppers. Threatened dragonflies, such as the banded darter, southern emerald damselfly live here as do birds like the whitethroat and little grebe. Reed buntings, reed warblers and snipe also occur here.

The near-natural grassland and wet meadows in the upper reaches of the river near Rödinghausen are under nature conservation protection. The nature reserve has an area of 14.5 hectares (36 acres) and is known as the Aubach Valley Nature Reserve (NSG Aubachtal). Particularly valuable are the rich wet meadows and pastures with their sedges and reed beds.

== Tributaries ==
Its tributaries include the Flöthe and the Kleine Aue ("Little Aue"), that join it from the east, and the Großer Dieckfluss, which flows westwards, and merges into the Großer Aue at Preußisch Ströhen, at 52°29′59″N 8°39′02″E.

L = left-hand, R = right-hand tributaries looking downstream

- Klosterbach (R; near Dono)
- Nordbach (L; near Stukenhöfen)
- Schierenbeke (L; near Schwenningdorf)
- Mühlenbach (L; near Börninghausen)
- Bruchriede (R; near Holzhausen)
- Landwehrbach (L: near Holzhausen)
- Obermehner Mühlenbach / Mehner Bach (R; near Hedem)
- Grenzgraben (L; near Hedem)
- Hedemer Bruchgraben (L; near Hedem)
- Gartemanns Bach (R; near Fiestel)
- Flöthe (R; Fiestel)
- Fabenstedter Graben (R; near Gabelhorst)
- Kleine Aue (R; near Holsingerort)
- Großer Dieckfluss (L; near Börstel)
- Wickriede (R; near Rehersort)
- Langer Graben (R; near Hakenhäuserort)
- Herrenriede (R)
- Wiete (L; Schweineinsel)
- Kleine Aue (L; Barenburg)
- Sule (L; Barenburg)
- Schweinelake (R)
- Kirchdorfer Mühlenbach (R; Gut Borgstedt)
- Schliebeeke (R)
- Allerbeeke (L; Hasselbusch)
- Siede (L; Wehrenberg)
- Rüsselbach (R)
- Peeksriede (L)
- Sarninghäuser Meerbach (R; Sarninghausen)
- Langhorst Kuhlengraben (R; Flecken Steyerberg)
- Dunkgraben (L; Reese)
- Winterbach (L; Eickhof)

== See also ==
- Großer Auesee
- List of rivers of Lower Saxony
- List of rivers of North Rhine-Westphalia
