= Schwenningdorf =

- Ortsteil of Rödinghausen
- Coat of arms

- Location of Schwenningdorf within Rödinghausen
- Interactive map of Schwenningdorf
- Location within Germany Location within North Rhine-Westphalia
- Coordinates: 52°14′51″N 8°29′34″E
- Country: Germany
- State: North Rhine-Westphalia
- Admin. region: Detmold
- District: Herford
- Municipality: Rödinghausen

Area
  - Total: 7.449 km^{2} (2.876 sq mi)
- Elevation: 95–190 m (312–623 ft)

Population
  - Total: 2,356
  - Density: 316.3/km^{2} (819.2/sq mi)
- Time zone: UTC+01:00 (CET)
  - Summer (DST): UTC+02:00 (CEST)
- Postal codes: 32289
- Dialling codes: 05746

Schwenningdorf is a village in the parish of Rödinghausen in the northeastern part of the German federal state of North Rhine-Westphalia. Until 1968 Schwenningdorf was an independent parish in the Amt of Rödinghausen. The village was first mentioned in the records in 1088.

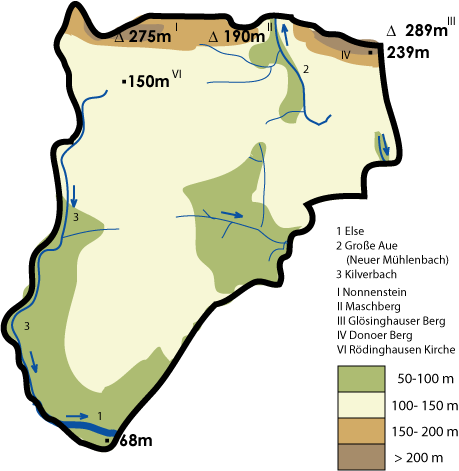
Relief map of Rödinghausen

== Location ==
The village of Schwenningdorf lies to the north of Rödinghausen on the slopes of the Wiehen Hills. Its highest elevation is the Maschberg at 190 m above sea level (NN). The lowest point is the valley of the Große Aue at around 80 m above NN. Schwenningdorf has about 2,356 inhabitants and an area of 7.449 square kilometres (1,841 acres) (316 people per km^{2}).

The valley of the Aue and its neighbouring valleys Wehmerhorster Wiesental and the region of the Schierenbeke are nature reserves.

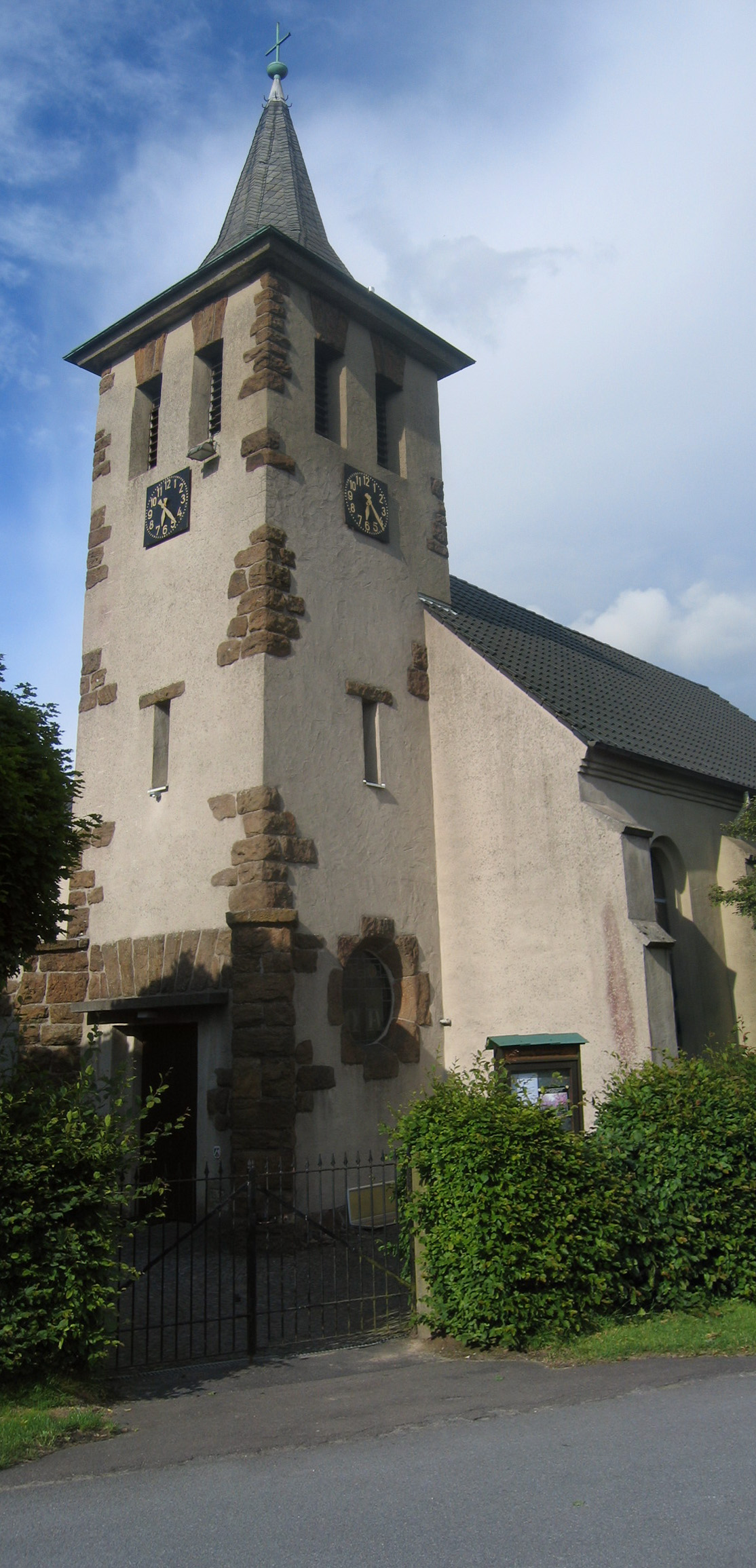
St John's

== Population ==
The following overview shows the population figures for Schwenningdorf based on the respective parish area until its incorporation into the parish of Rödinghausen on 1 January 1969. Changes in the parish boundary occurred due to the incorporation of the settlements in the Bieren area on 4 March 1898 (1895: 10 inhabitants) and 1 April 1932 (1925: 2 inhabitants). The figures given are census returns. From 1871 and for 1946 the returns were based on the population present in the village, and from 1925 on the actual residential population. Before 1871 the censuses were not based on standard criteria.

Year	Population
1818 (31 Dec)	800
1834 (31 Dec)	789
1837 (31 Dec)	814
1843 (31 Dec)	902
1849 (3 Dec)	961
1852 (3 Dec)	1,058

Year	Population
1858 (3 Dec)	1,039
1867 (3 Dec)	1,068
1871 (1 Dec)	1,039
1885 (1 Dec)	1,006
1895 (1 Dec)	994
1905 (1 Dec)	1,211

Year	Population
1925 (1 Dec)	1,313
1933 (16 June)	1,421
1939 (17 May)	1,487
1946 (29 Oct)	1,816
1950 (13 Sep)	1,919
1961 (6 June)	1,853
