= Großer Auesee =

Lake in Espelkamp, North Rhine-Westphalia, Germany

- Location within North Rhine-Westphalia
- Location: Kreis Minden-Lübbecke, North Rhine-Westphalia
- Coordinates: 52°23′27″N 8°35′8″E
- Primary inflows: Große Aue
- Primary outflows: Große Aue
- Basin countries: Germany
- Max. length: 550 m (1,800 ft)
- Max. width: 80 m (260 ft)
- Surface area: 4.5 ha (11 acres)
- Average depth: 2 m (6 ft 7 in)
- Max. depth: 3 m (9.8 ft)
- Water volume: 135,000 m^{3} (4,800,000 cu ft)
- Shore length^{1}: 1.5 km (0.93 mi)
- Surface elevation: 45 m (148 ft)
- ^{1} Shore length is not a well-defined measure.

Großer Auesee is a lake in Kreis Minden-Lübbecke, North Rhine-Westphalia, Germany. At an elevation of 45 m, its surface area is 4.5 ha.
