= Schierenbeke =

River in Germany

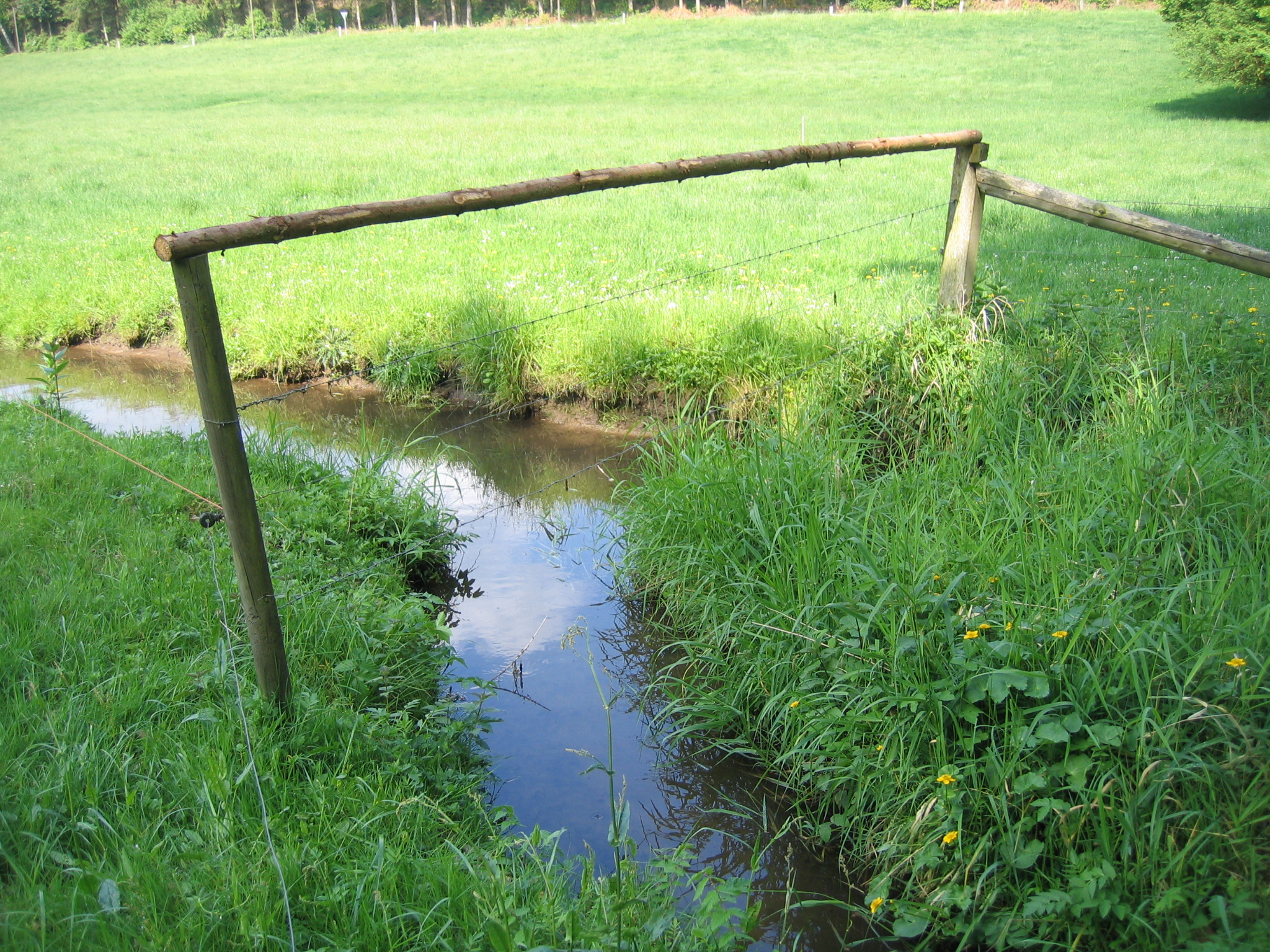
- Mouth of the Schierenbeke (foreground) into the Große Aue

Location
- Country: Germany
- State: North Rhine-Westphalia

Physical characteristics
- Source
  - location: In Schwenningdorf
  - coordinates: 52°15′11″N 8°32′41″E
  - elevation: 135 m above sea level (NN)
- Mouth
  - location: Near Schwenningdorf-Neue Mühle into the Große Aue
  - coordinates: 52°15′44″N 8°31′21″E
  - elevation: 79 m above sea level (NN)
- Length: 2.4 km (1.5 mi)
- Basin size: <10 km²

Basin features
- Progression: Große Aue→ Weser→ North Sea
- Landmarks: Villages: Rödinghausen
- Tributaries
  - left: Wehmerhorster Bach

The Schierenbeke is a 2.4-kilometre-long (1.5 mi) left tributary of the Große Aue, or Neuer Mühlenbach as it is known in its upper reaches in the German state of North Rhine-Westphalia. The stream lies entirely within the East Westphalian parish of Rödinghausen in the district of Herford.

== Course ==
The Schierenbeke rises in Schwenningdorf at a height of around 135 m above sea level (NN). The river flows in a west-to-east direction south of and parallel to the Wiehengebirge hills. In its upper reaches the stream runs through the Schierenbeke Nature Reserve. The valley at the 1.0 kilometre point is known locally as the Wolfskammer ("Wolf's Chamber"). A left tributary of the Schierenbeke is the Wehmerhorster Bach, which enters at kilometre 0.8. The Schierenbeke discharges into the Neuer Mühlenbach or Große Aue at a point 81.5 km up the Aue from its mouth. The confluence is at around 79 m above sea level (NN).

Beke or Biäke means Bach or 'stream' in the Low German language.

== Nature ==
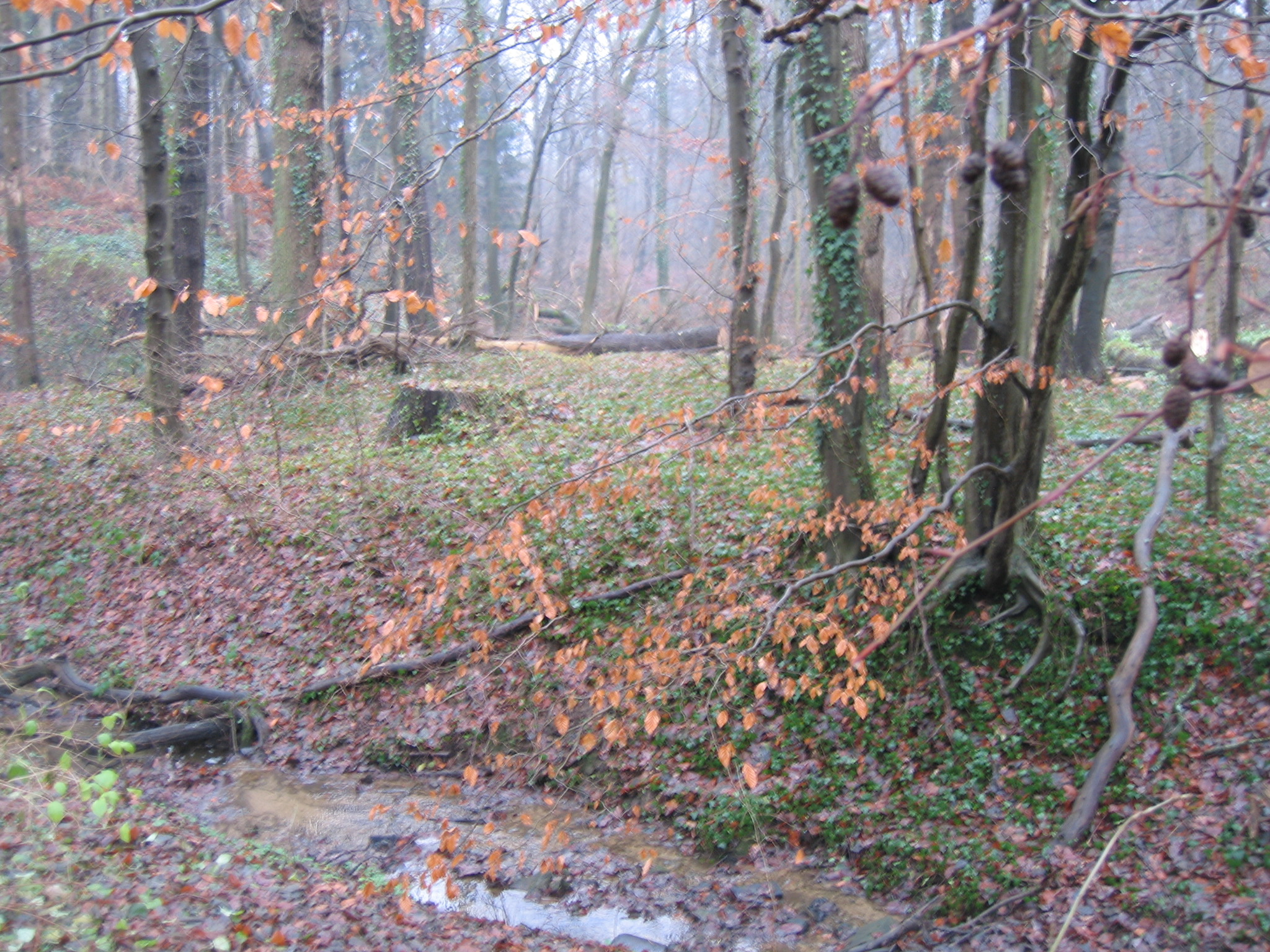
The Schierenbeke in its middle reaches by the Wolfskammer

The Schierenbeeke nature reserve embraces the upper reaches of the Schierenbeke and a neighbouring stream and their valleys as well as the forested area at the Wolfskammer and has a total area of 13.5 hectares (33 acres). The streams are classified as 'near-natural'. Their water quality of class I to II supports a large number of rare animal species. The boundary of the region is close to the nature reserves of Wehmerhorster Wiesental and Auebachtal.

== See also ==
- List of rivers in Ostwestfalen-Lippe
