= Rauenstein (hill) =

Mountain in Saxony, Germany

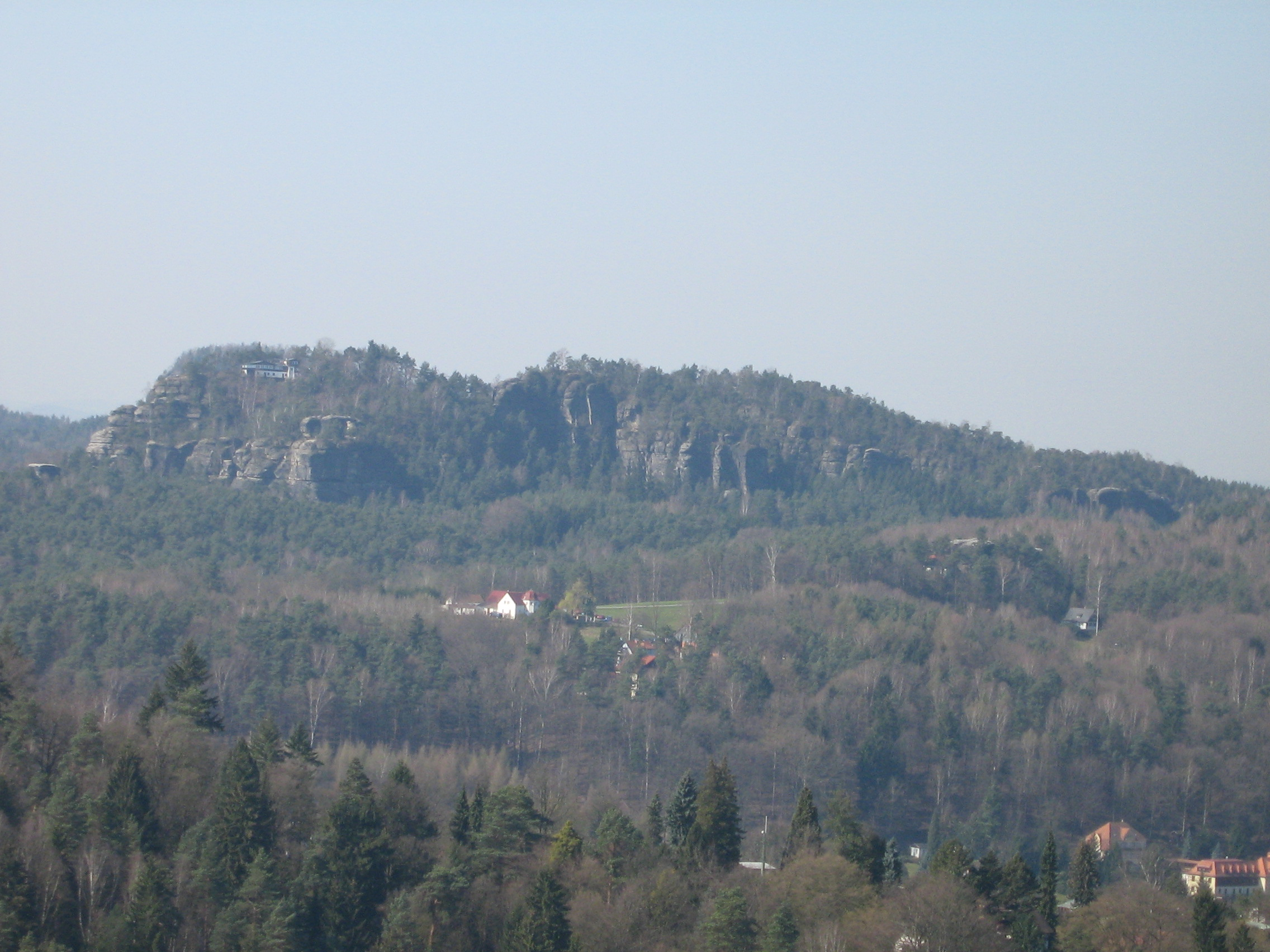
- View from Rathen of the Rauenstein

Highest point
- Elevation: 303.7 m above sea level (HN) (996 ft)
- Coordinates: 50°56′54″N 14°03′15″E

Geography
- Location within Saxony
- Location: Saxony (Germany)
- Parent range: Saxon Switzerland

Geology
- Mountain type: table hill
- Rock type: Sandstone

The Rauenstein is a table hill in Saxon Switzerland in Germany. It rises west of the Elbe inside the Elbe loop near Rathen. It has a height of 304 metres (997 feet) and drops steeply to the north into the Elbe valley. It has a deeply incised structure and is about 600 metres (2,000 feet) long and 200 metres (660 feet) wide. It thus rises almost 100 metres (330 feet) over the surrounding area. The Rauenstein is almost completely wooded, but has several dominant sandstone rock faces. The sandstone here is very soft and heavily weathered.

== Location and area ==
On the eastern side is the village of Weißig in the borough of Struppen. On the north and east side there are various climbing towers, the best known being the 18-metre-high (59 ft) Nonne or Nonnenstein, that is situated 200 metres from the eastern side of the Rauenstein. The rock was the site of a medieval watchtower (Burgwarte).

At the southeastern end of the Rauenstein is a hill restaurant that has been there since 1893. Before that, from 1886 to 1893, drinks were sold in the Kapp Cave (Kapphöhle), also the Kappmeyer or Kamm Cave, on the summit plateau. One year earlier the touristic development of the Rauenstein had been started by the Dresden Branch of the Mountain Club.

== Views ==
From the viewing point at the hill restaurant there is a panoramic view of Lilienstein and the village of Weißig.

== Gallery ==
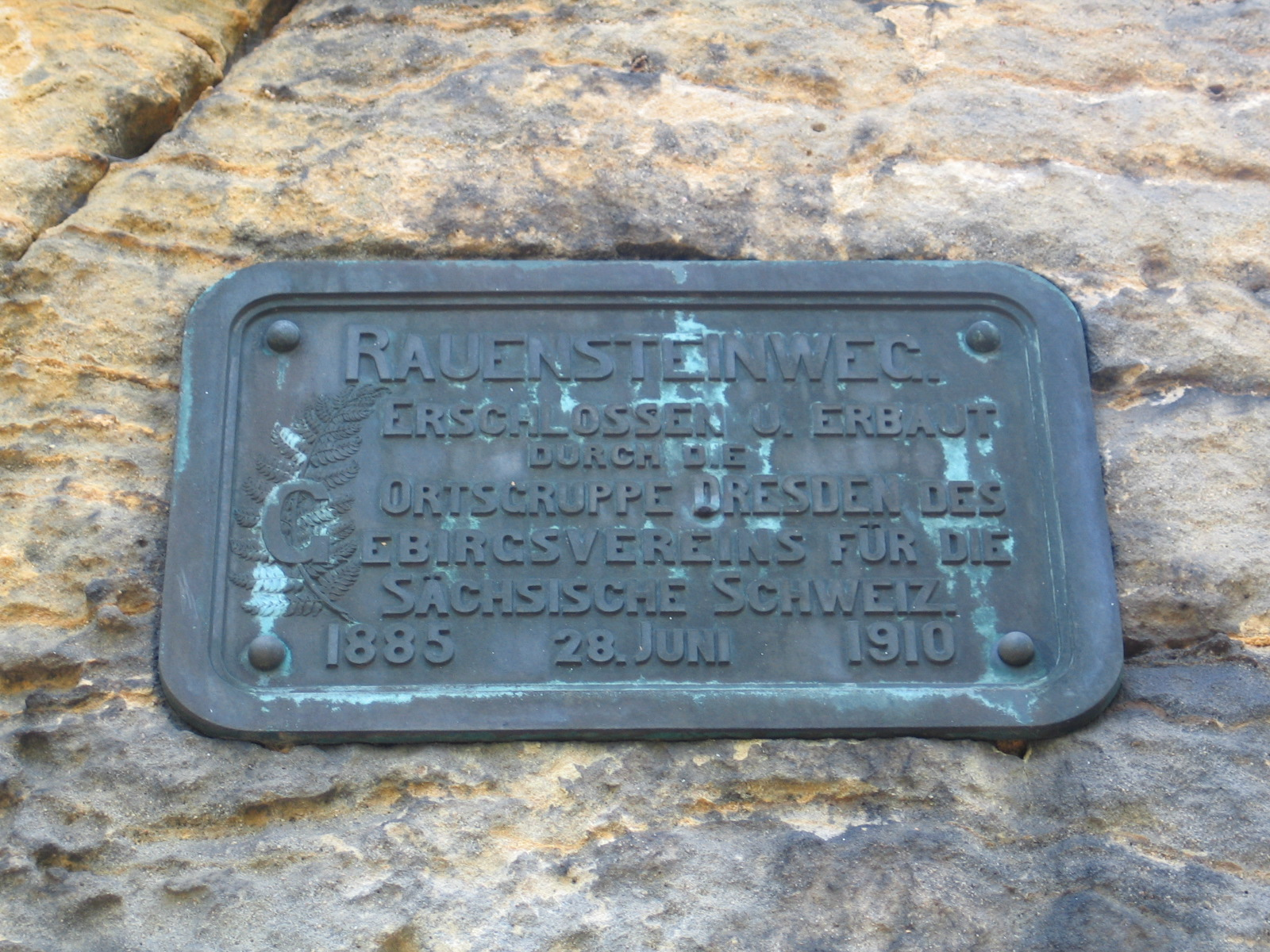
Plaque on the construction of the Rauenstein trail

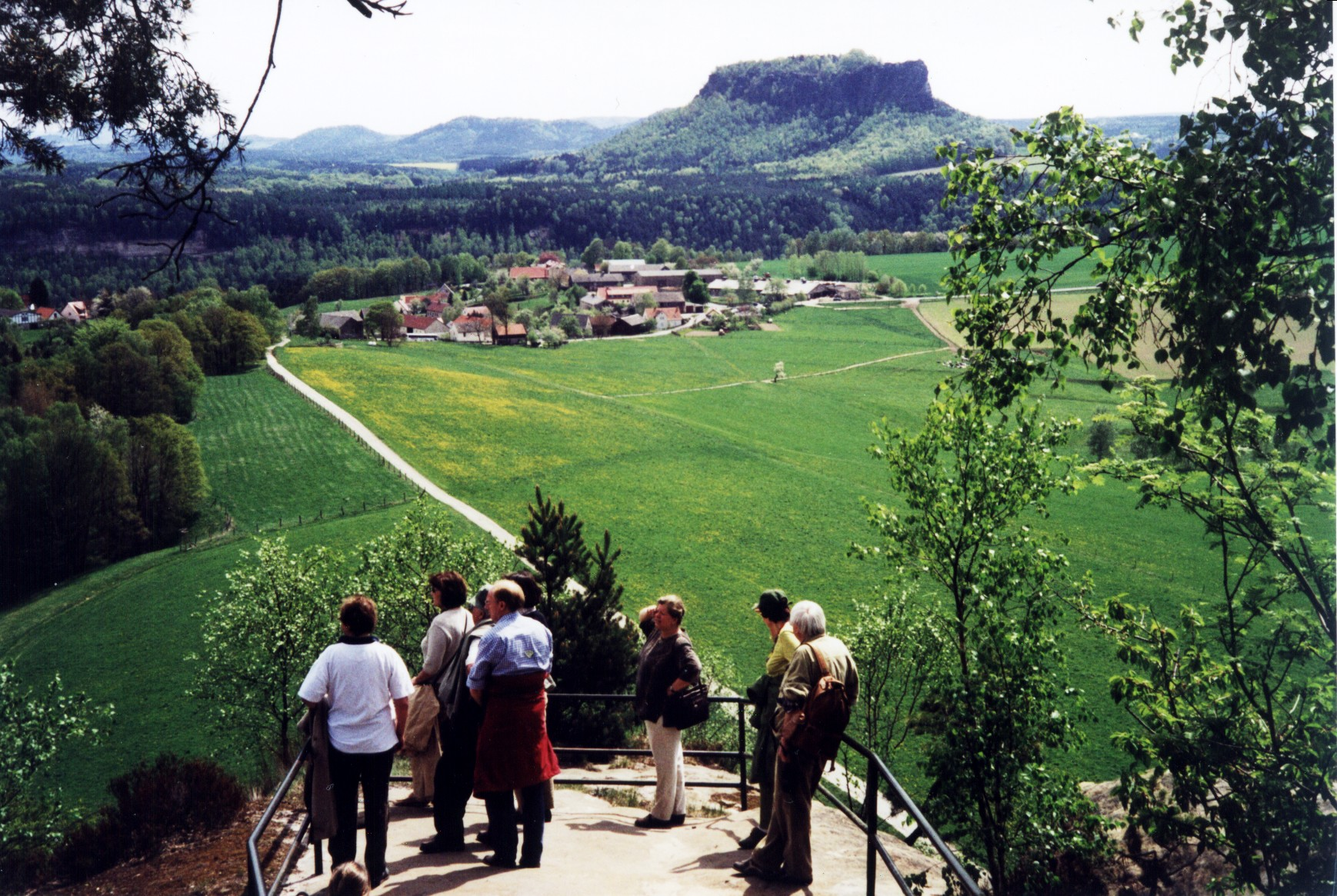
View from the Rauenstein (hill restaurant) towards Lilienstein

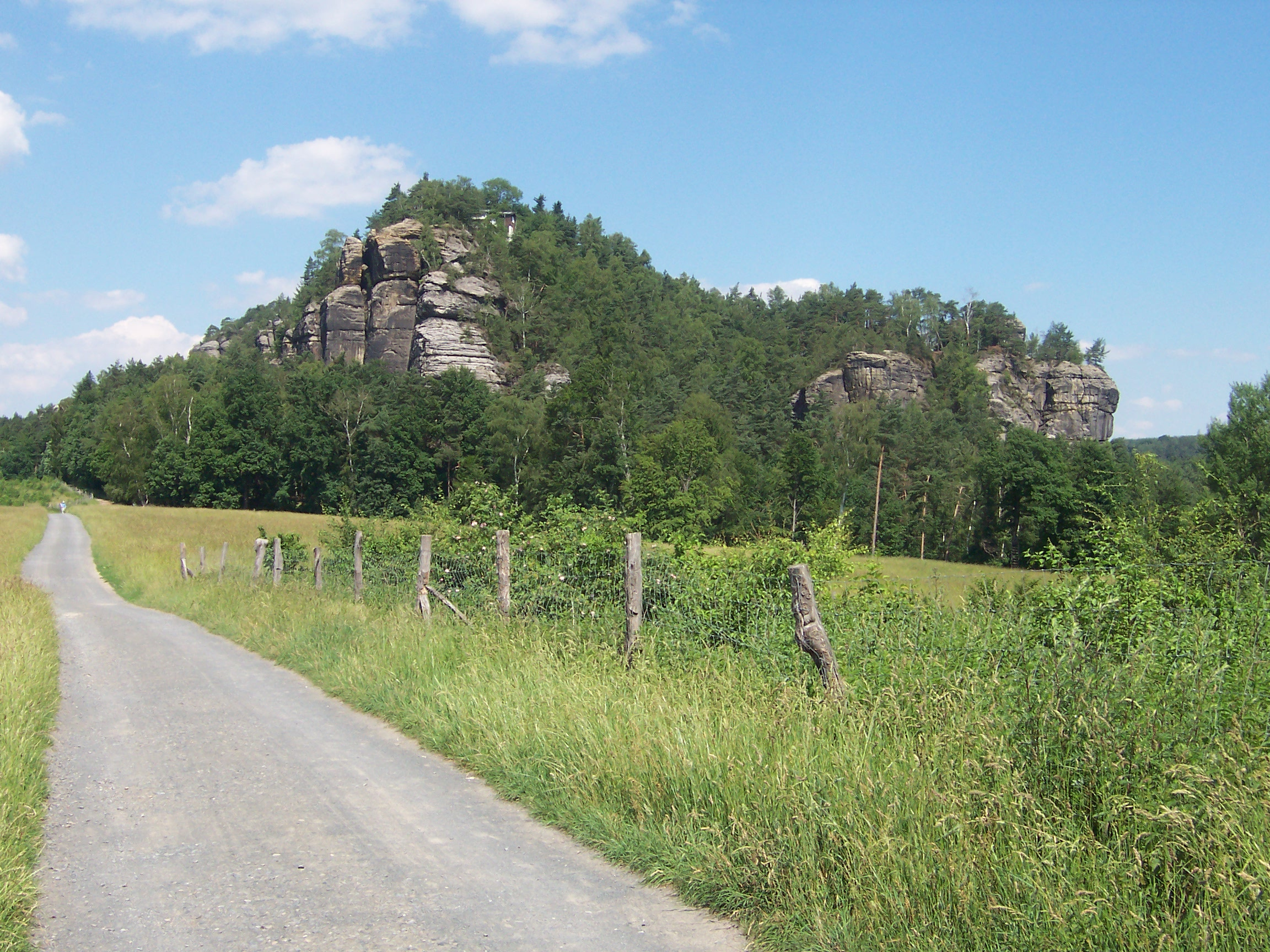
The Rauenstein seen from Weißig
