= Großer Dieckfluss =

River in Germany

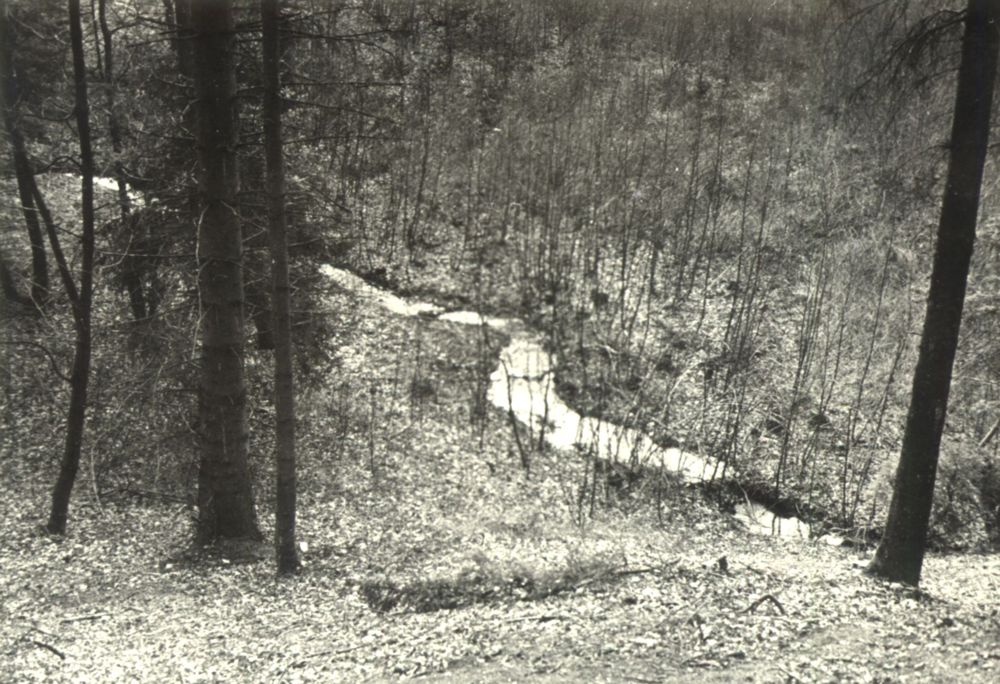

Location
- Country: Germany
- State: North Rhine-Westphalia

Physical characteristics
- Mouth
  - location: Große Aue
  - coordinates: 52.5056°N 8.6562°E
- Length: 37.5 km (23.3 mi)
- Basin size: 179 km^{2} (69 sq mi)

Basin features
- Progression: Große Aue→ Weser→ North Sea

The Großer Dieckfluss is a river of North Rhine-Westphalia, Germany. It flows into the Große Aue in Preußisch Ströhen.

== See also ==
- List of rivers of North Rhine-Westphalia
