= Nonne =

Rock formation in Germany

Coordinates: 50°57′3.54835″N 14°4′3.93″E

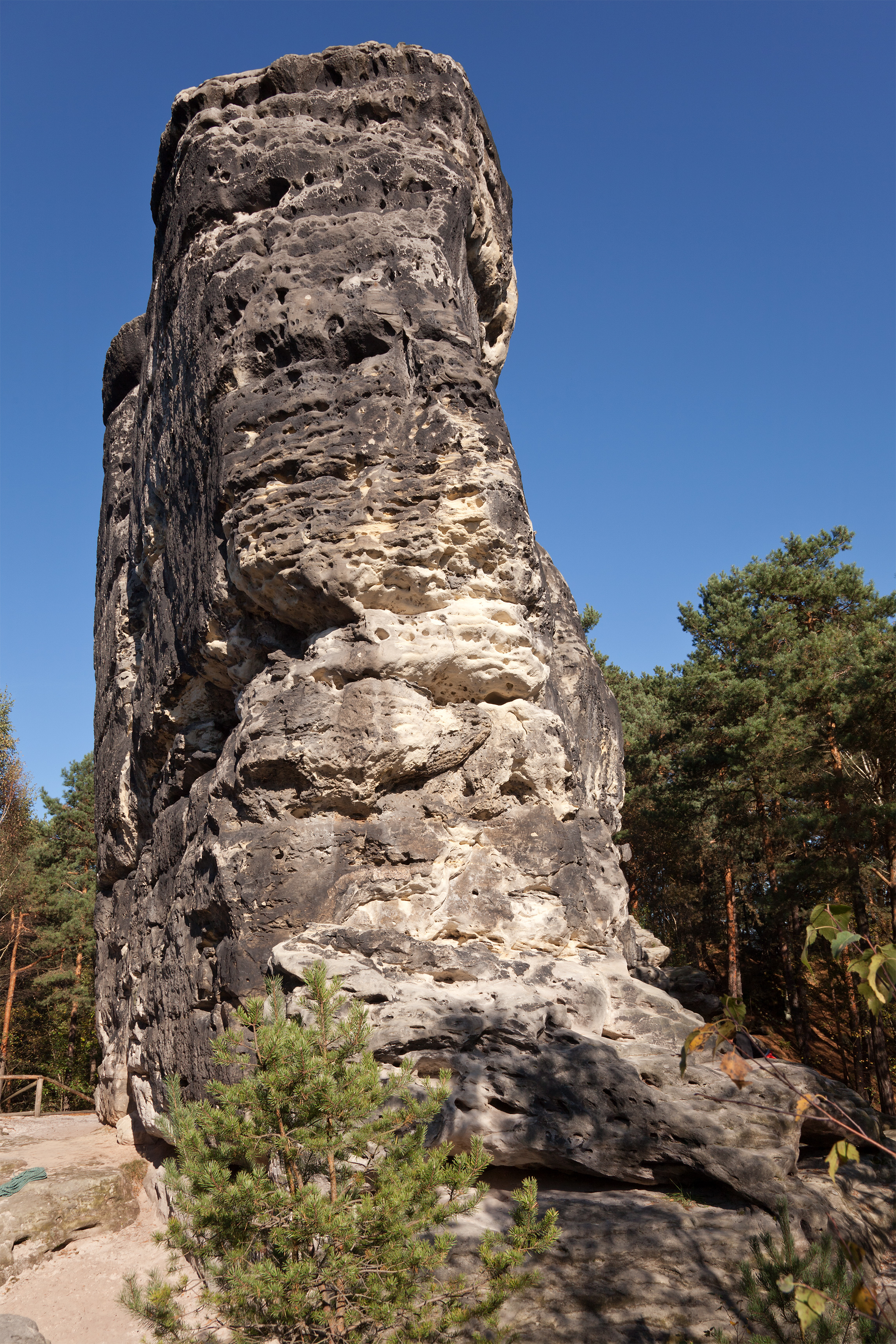
The Nonne

The Nonne (also Nonnenstein) is a roughly 18-metre-high, isolated, standing sandstone rock and climbing peak in Saxon Switzerland in Germany. The rock is located southeast of Rathen, east of the rock chain of Rauenstein.

In the Middle Ages the rock was used in the 15th century as a watchtower (Burgwarte), similar to that on the other side of the Elbe, Neurathen Castle. To that end the rock crevice below the summit plateau was widened into an artificial cave, used as a guardhouse. On the eastern side there are more traces of hammers. In addition, an artificial, earth embankment, about 35 m long, was built. Archaeological investigations ins 1963 brought to light pieces of ceramic, the spindle whorl of a spindle, the site of a hearth and fragments of charcoal.

In 1888 the Nonne was climbed for the first time for fun and without using ladders. Hitherto the rocks had always been climbed with the aid of ladders even after the watchtower had closed. The Alte Weg ("Old Way", grade II in the Saxon climbing grade system) has since become a popular climbing route especially for beginners. This has however resulted in erosion damage on the surrounding areas of forest and hillsides.

== Sources ==
- Peter Rölke (ed.): Wander- & Naturführer Sächsische Schweiz. Vol. 2, Verlag Rölke, Dresden, 2000, ISBN 3-934514-09-X
