= Schmerenbeck Educational Centre for Gifted and Talented Children =

Schmerenbeck Educational Centre for Gifted and Talented Children South Africa
- Former names: The Association for the Education of Gifted Children in South Africa (A.E.G.C.)
- Type: Public university
- Established: 11 September 1971 (as the Association for the Education of Gifted Children in South Africa) 19 November 1980 (formally established as the Schmerenbeck Educational Centre)
- President: Professor S.P. Jackson (1971-1979)
- Director: Ms Beverly Kahn (1979) Dr Gillian Eriksson (1980-1991) Ms Eva Biebuyck (1991-1992)
- Location: Johannesburg, Gauteng, South Africa; 26°11′27″S 28°1′49″E

The Schmerenbeck Educational Centre for Gifted and Talented Children, an organisation based at the University of the Witwatersrand in Johannesburg, South Africa, promoted, encouraged and fostered the education of gifted children within South Africa without regard to race. The centre was originally housed on campus in portable prefabricated buildings before it moved to a house in the Johannesburg suburb of Parktown opposite the University of the Witwatersrand's Education Department until it closed in 1995.

== History ==
The Association for the Education of Gifted Children in South Africa was established in 1971. In 1973, Ami Schmerenbeck of Windhoek showed interest in the education of gifted children. After her death in April 1975, her sister, Suzanne Sittman, trustee of the Schmerenbeck estate, negotiated regarding the establishment of the "Ami and Kurt Schmerenbeck Fund". It was agreed that a portion of the bequest be used to establish a centre and on 26 February 1977 Sittman formally opened the "Schmerenbeck Educational Centre".
