= Preußisch Oldendorf =

- Town
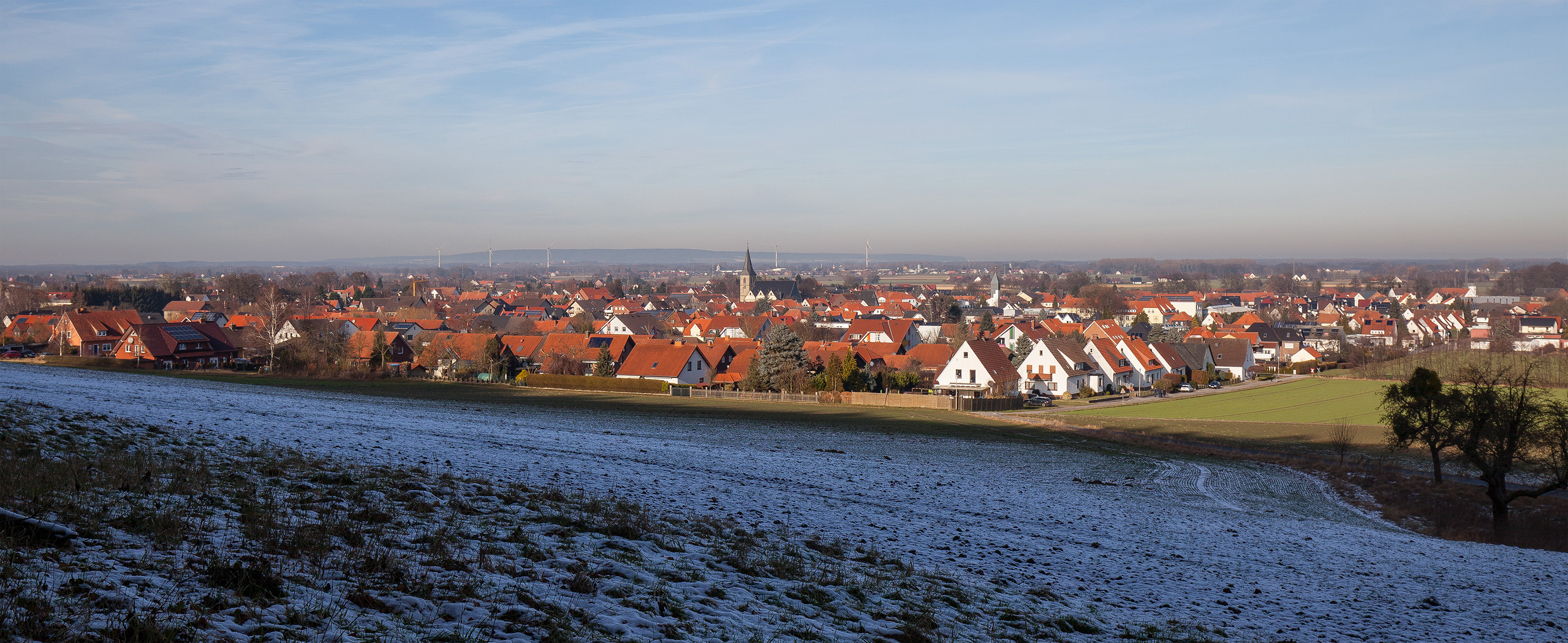
- Preußisch Oldendorf seen from the southwest

- Flag Coat of arms

- Location of Preußisch Oldendorf within Minden-Lübbecke district
- Interactive map of Preußisch Oldendorf
- Location within Germany Location within North Rhine-Westphalia
- Coordinates: 52°17′00″N 08°30′00″E
- Country: Germany
- State: North Rhine-Westphalia
- Admin. region: Detmold
- District: Minden-Lübbecke
- Subdivisions: 10

Government
  - Mayor (2020–25): Marko Steiner (Ind.)

Area
  - Total: 68.76 km^{2} (26.55 sq mi)
- Elevation: 67 m (220 ft)

Population (2025-12-31)
  - Total: 12,486
  - Density: 181.6/km^{2} (470.3/sq mi)
- Time zone: UTC+01:00 (CET)
  - Summer (DST): UTC+02:00 (CEST)
- Postal codes: 32361
- Dialling codes: +49-5742
- Vehicle registration: MI
- Website: www.preussischoldendorf.de

Preußisch Oldendorf (German: [ˈpʁɔʏsɪʃ ˈʔɔldn̩dɔʁf]) is a town in the Minden-Lübbecke district, in North Rhine-Westphalia, Germany. In 1905 the town name Oldendorf was changed officially by putting "Preußisch" in front of it, to make the distinction from other towns with the same name more easy (especially for mail and train stations).

== Geography ==
Preußisch Oldendorf is situated on the north side of the Wiehengebirge, approx. 9 km west of Lübbecke, 24 km north-west of Herford and 30 km east of Osnabrück.

=== Extent and land usage of the borough ===
The town's borough has an area of 66.78 km^{2}. Its maximum north–south extent is about 11 km, its maximum east–west extent around 10 km. The highest point in the district is the Altes Verbrenn (291.1 m) in the southeast of the borough. The lowest point (45.8 m) lies in the northwest of the borough in the valley of the Großer Dieckfluss. Its entire northern boundary does not exceed 50 m at any point.

The territory of the borough is predominantly used for arable land and is correspondingly rural. In general, only the Wiehen Hills and the Egge ridge are wooded. Hollwinkel Wood is the only smaller woodland on the plain. Because the Wiehen and Egge constitute a relatively wide section of the Wiehen Hills here, woods occupy a relatively high proportion of the land - just under 20% - in comparison with neighbouring districts. The following table gives an overview of land usage:

| Area by type of use | Agricultural land | Wood- land | Settlements and transport routes | Water- bodies | Special usage |
|---|---|---|---|---|---|
| Area in ha | 4,335 | 1.343 | 995 | 183 | 3 |
| Proportion | 63.3% | 19.5% | 14.5% | 2.7% | % |

Source: LDS

=== Neighbouring places ===
- Stemwede
- Espelkamp
- Lübbecke
- Hüllhorst
- Rödinghausen
- Melle
- Bad Essen

=== Division of the town ===
Preußisch Oldendorf consists of 10 districts:

- Börninghausen
- Engershausen
- Getmold
- Harlinghausen
- Hedem
- Bad Holzhausen
- Lashorst
- Offelten
- Preußisch Oldendorf
- Schröttinghausen

== Population ==
Historical population

| Year | Pop. | ±% p.a. |
|---|---|---|
| 1965 | 10,661 | — |
| 1970 | 10,630 | −0.06% |
| 1975 | 10,411 | −0.42% |
| 1980 | 9,977 | −0.85% |
| 1985 | 9,873 | −0.21% |
| 1990 | 10,974 | +2.14% |
| 1995 | 12,500 | +2.64% |

| Year | Pop. | ±% p.a. |
|---|---|---|
| 2000 | 13,283 | +1.22% |
| 2005 | 13,393 | +0.17% |
| 2010 | 12,862 | −0.81% |
| 2015 | 12,647 | −0.34% |
| 2020 | 12,236 | −0.66% |
| 2025 | 12,486 | +0.41% |

Source: Landesdatabank Nordrhein-Westfalen

== Notable residents ==
- Karl-Friedrich Höcker (1911–2000), German Nazi SS concentration camp officer and war criminal
