= Barenburg =

- Municipality
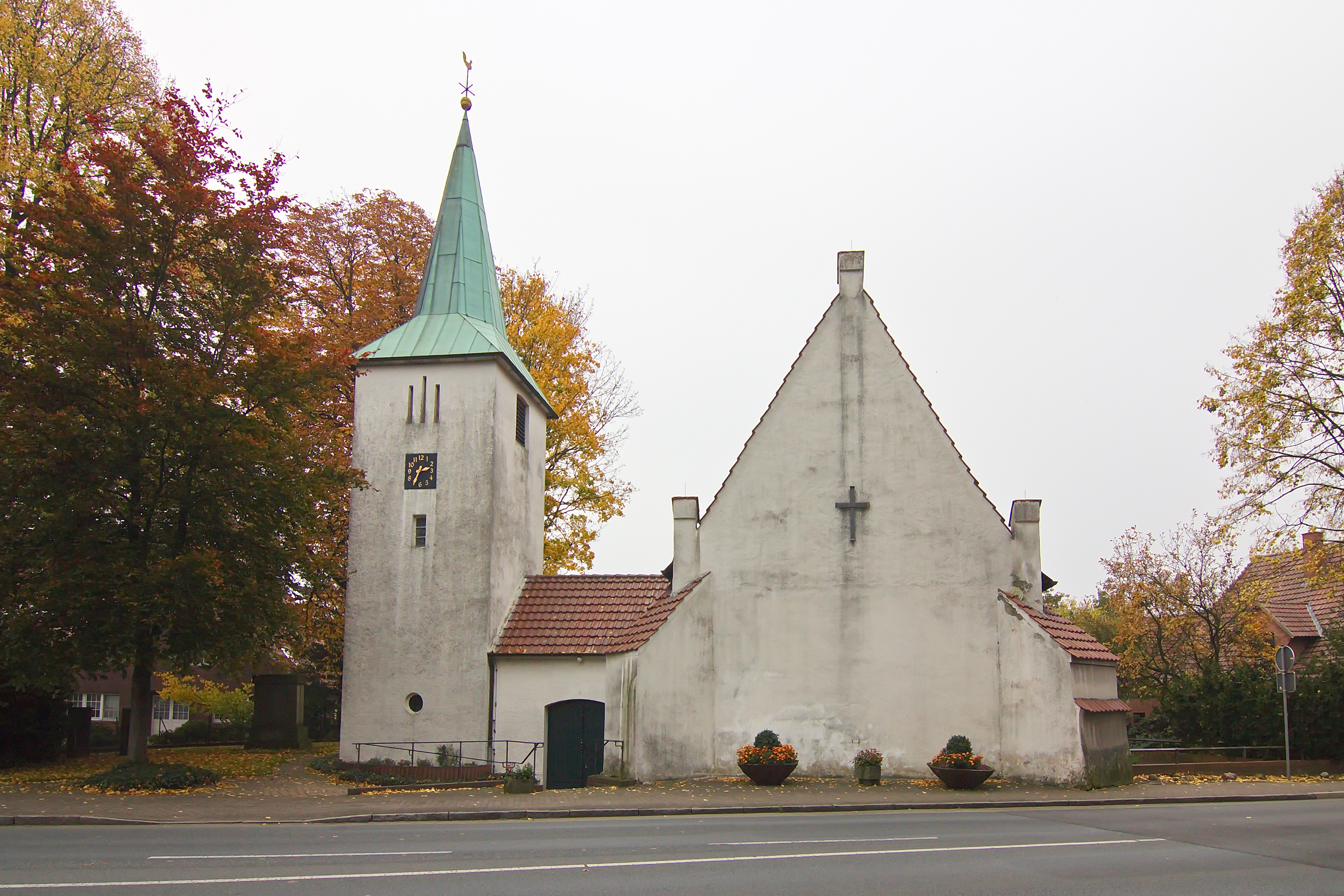
- Church in Barenburg

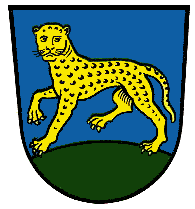
- Coat of arms

- Location of Barenburg within Diepholz district
- Interactive map of Barenburg
- Location within Germany Location within Lower Saxony
- Coordinates: 52°37′14″N 08°48′02″E
- Country: Germany
- State: Lower Saxony
- District: Diepholz
- Municipal assoc.: Kirchdorf

Government
  - Mayor: André Meyer

Area
  - Total: 16.45 km^{2} (6.35 sq mi)
- Elevation: 35 m (115 ft)

Population (2025-12-31)
  - Total: 1,218
  - Density: 74.04/km^{2} (191.8/sq mi)
- Time zone: UTC+01:00 (CET)
  - Summer (DST): UTC+02:00 (CEST)
- Postal codes: 27245
- Dialling codes: 04273
- Vehicle registration: DH
- Website: www.barenburg.de

Barenburg (German pronunciation: [ˈbaːʁənbʊʁk]; Low German: Baarnborg) is a municipality in the district of Diepholz, in Lower Saxony, Germany.
