= Sulingen =

- Town
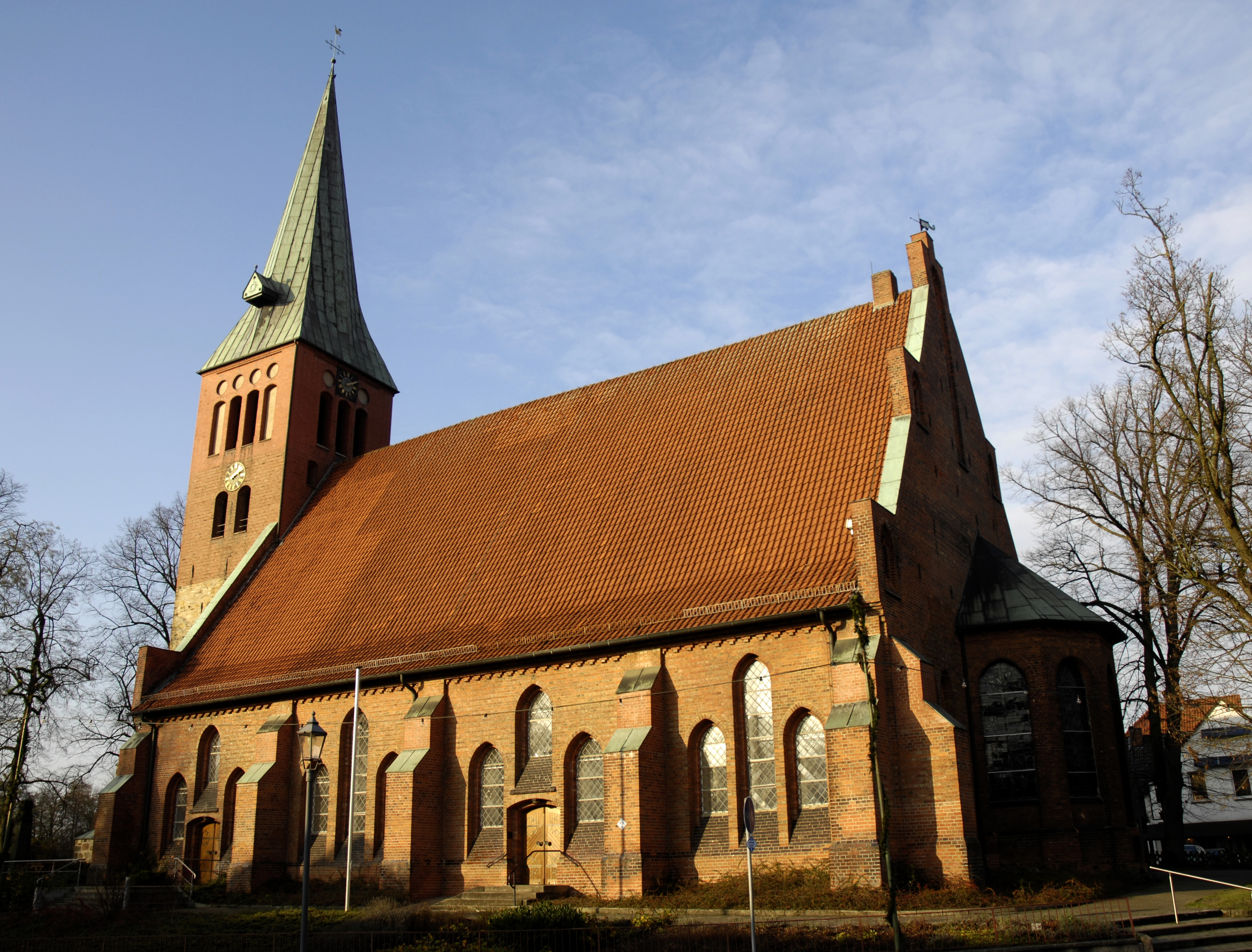
- Church of Saint Nicholas

- Coat of arms

- Location of Sulingen within Diepholz district
- Interactive map of Sulingen
- Location within Germany Location within Lower Saxony
- Coordinates: 52°40′N 08°48′E
- Country: Germany
- State: Lower Saxony
- District: Diepholz
- Subdivisions: 6 districts

Government
  - Mayor (2021–26): Patrick Bade (Ind.)

Area
  - Total: 110.83 km^{2} (42.79 sq mi)
- Elevation: 49 m (161 ft)

Population (2025-12-31)
  - Total: 13,378
  - Density: 120.71/km^{2} (312.63/sq mi)
- Time zone: UTC+01:00 (CET)
  - Summer (DST): UTC+02:00 (CEST)
- Postal codes: 27232
- Dialling codes: 0 42 71
- Vehicle registration: DH
- Website: www.sulingen.de

Sulingen (German pronunciation: [ˈzuːlɪŋən]) is a town in the district of Diepholz, Lower Saxony, Germany. It is situated approximatively 30 km east of Diepholz, and 45 km south of Bremen.

== Sister cities ==
- Joniškis, Lithuania

== People from Sulingen ==
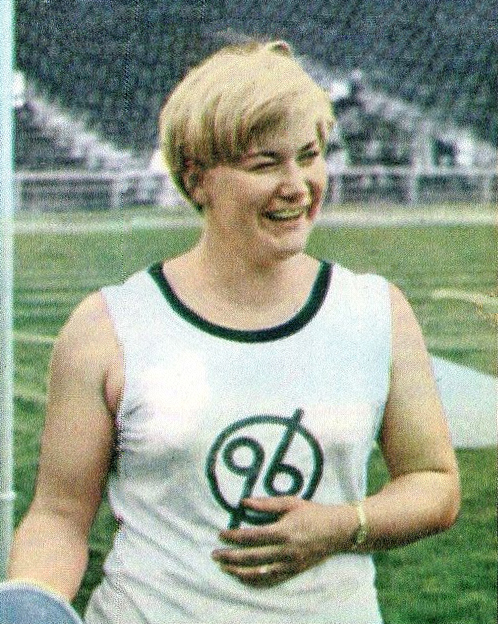
Liesel Westermann, 1968

- Walter Momper (born 1945), German politician (SPD), Governing Mayor of Berlin 1989–1991 and President of the German Bundesrat 1989-1990

=== Sport ===
- Liesel Westermann (born 1944), German discus thrower, silver medallist at the 1968 Summer Olympics; world record holder, 1967-1971.
- Jan Rosenthal (born 1986), footballer who played 234 games and 16 for Germany national under-21 football team
- Maurice Deville (born 1992), a Luxembourgish footballer who has played over 320 games
