= Rödinghausen =

- Municipality
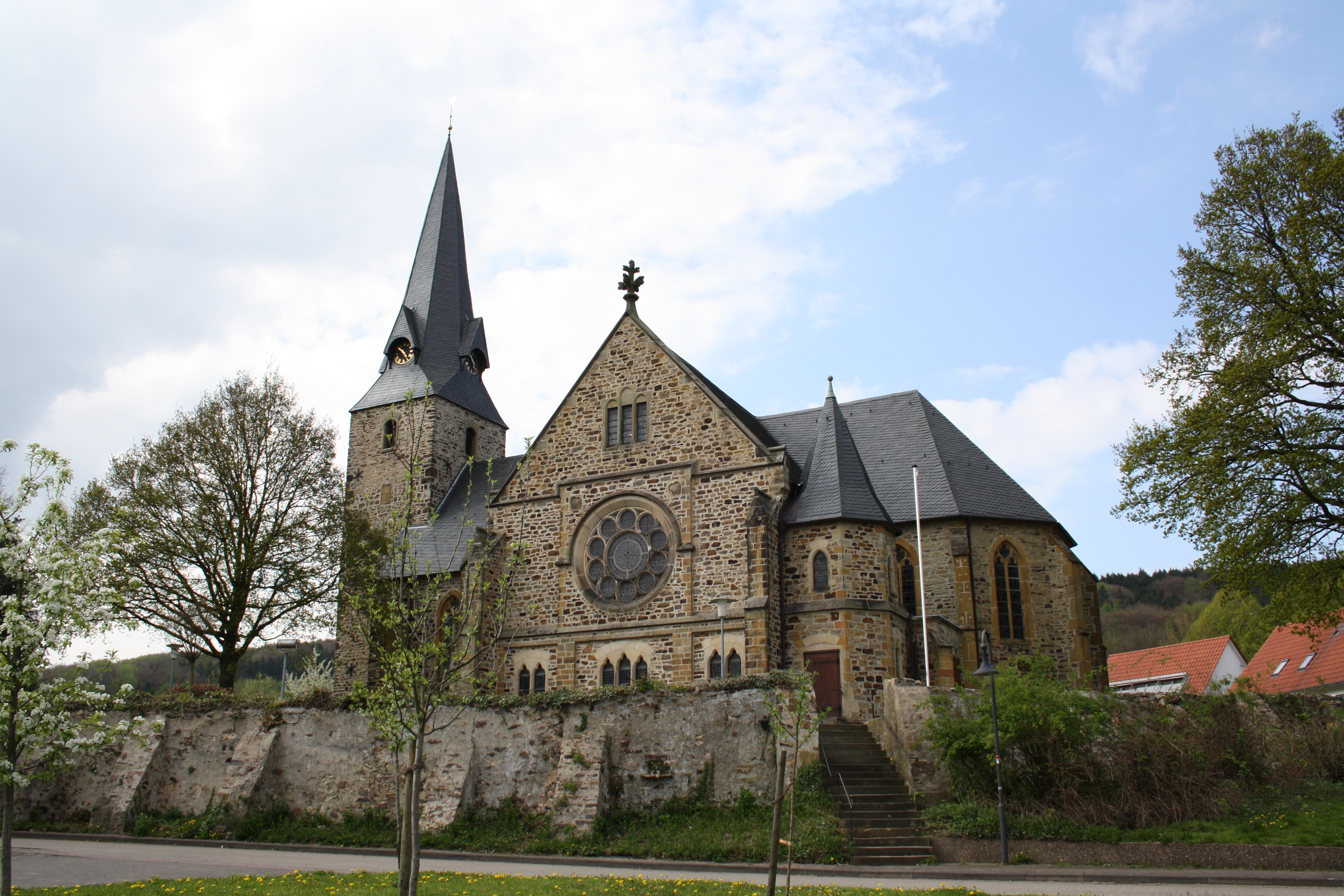
- Lutheran Church of St. Bartholomäus in Rödinghausen

- Flag Coat of arms

- Location of Rödinghausen within Herford district
- Interactive map of Rödinghausen
- Location within Germany Location within North Rhine-Westphalia
- Coordinates: 52°15′N 8°28′E
- Country: Germany
- State: North Rhine-Westphalia
- Admin. region: Detmold
- District: Herford
- Subdivisions: 5

Government
  - Mayor (2020–25): Siegfried Lux (SPD)

Area
  - Total: 36.27 km^{2} (14.00 sq mi)
- Elevation: 135 m (443 ft)

Population (2025-12-31)
  - Total: 10,063
  - Density: 277.4/km^{2} (718.6/sq mi)
- Time zone: UTC+01:00 (CET)
  - Summer (DST): UTC+02:00 (CEST)
- Postal codes: 32289
- Dialling codes: 05746 (Norden), 05226 (Bruchmühlen, southeast), 05223 (Bünde, southwest)
- Vehicle registration: HF
- Website: www.roedinghausen.de

Rödinghausen (German pronunciation: [ʁøːdɪŋˈhaʊzn̩]; Low German: Ränghiusen) is a municipality in the district of Herford, in North Rhine-Westphalia, Germany.

== Geography ==
Rödinghausen is situated on the southern slope of the Wiehengebirge, approx. 20 km north-west of Herford and 25 km north of Bielefeld.

=== Neighbouring municipalities ===
- Bünde
- Melle
- Preußisch Oldendorf
- Hüllhorst

=== Division of the municipality ===
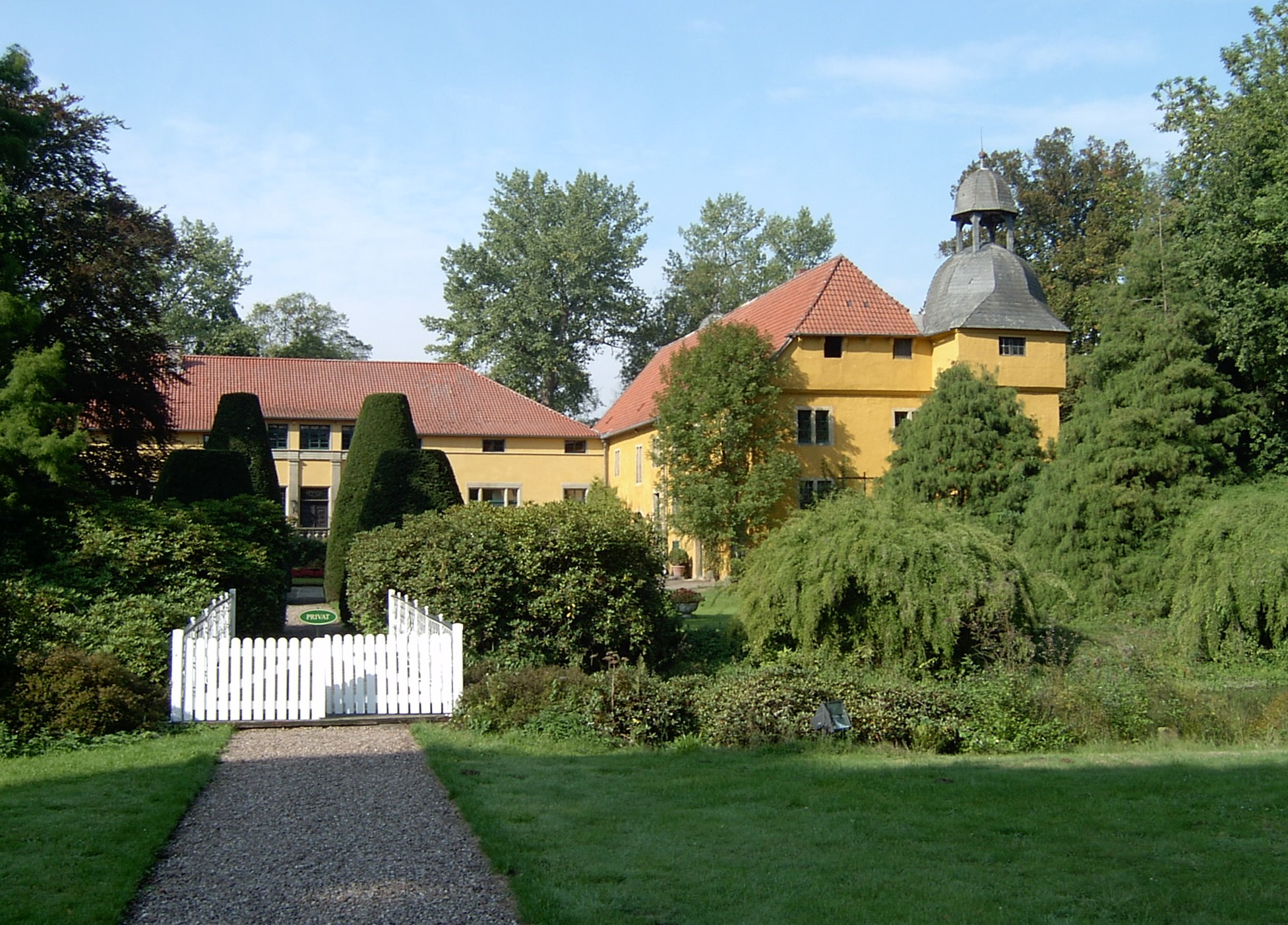
"Gut Böckel", the water castle in the village of Bieren

Rödinghausen consists of 5 villages:

- Bieren (1,299 inhabitants)
- Bruchmühlen (3,378 inhabitants); (named Westkilver until 1969)
- Ostkilver (1,876 inhabitants)
- Rödinghausen (1,644 inhabitants)
- Schwenningdorf (2,356 inhabitants)

== Population ==
Historical population

Year	Pop.	±% p.a.
1965	7,874	—
1970	8,046	+0.43%
1975	8,214	+0.41%
1980	8,228	+0.03%
1985	7,994	−0.58%
1990	8,700	+1.71%
1995	9,308	+1.36%

Year	Pop.	±% p.a.
2000	10,148	+1.74%
2005	10,181	+0.06%
2010	9,862	−0.63%
2015	9,717	−0.30%
2020	9,728	+0.02%
2025	10,063	+0.68%

Source: Landesdatabank Nordrhein-Westfalen

== Mayors ==
- since 2020: Siegfried Lux (SPD)
- 2004–2020: Ernst-Wilhelm Vortmeyer (* 1954) (SPD)
- 1999-2004: Kurt Vogt (SPD)
- 1969-1998: Günter Oberpenning (SPD)
