= Siede =

River in Germany

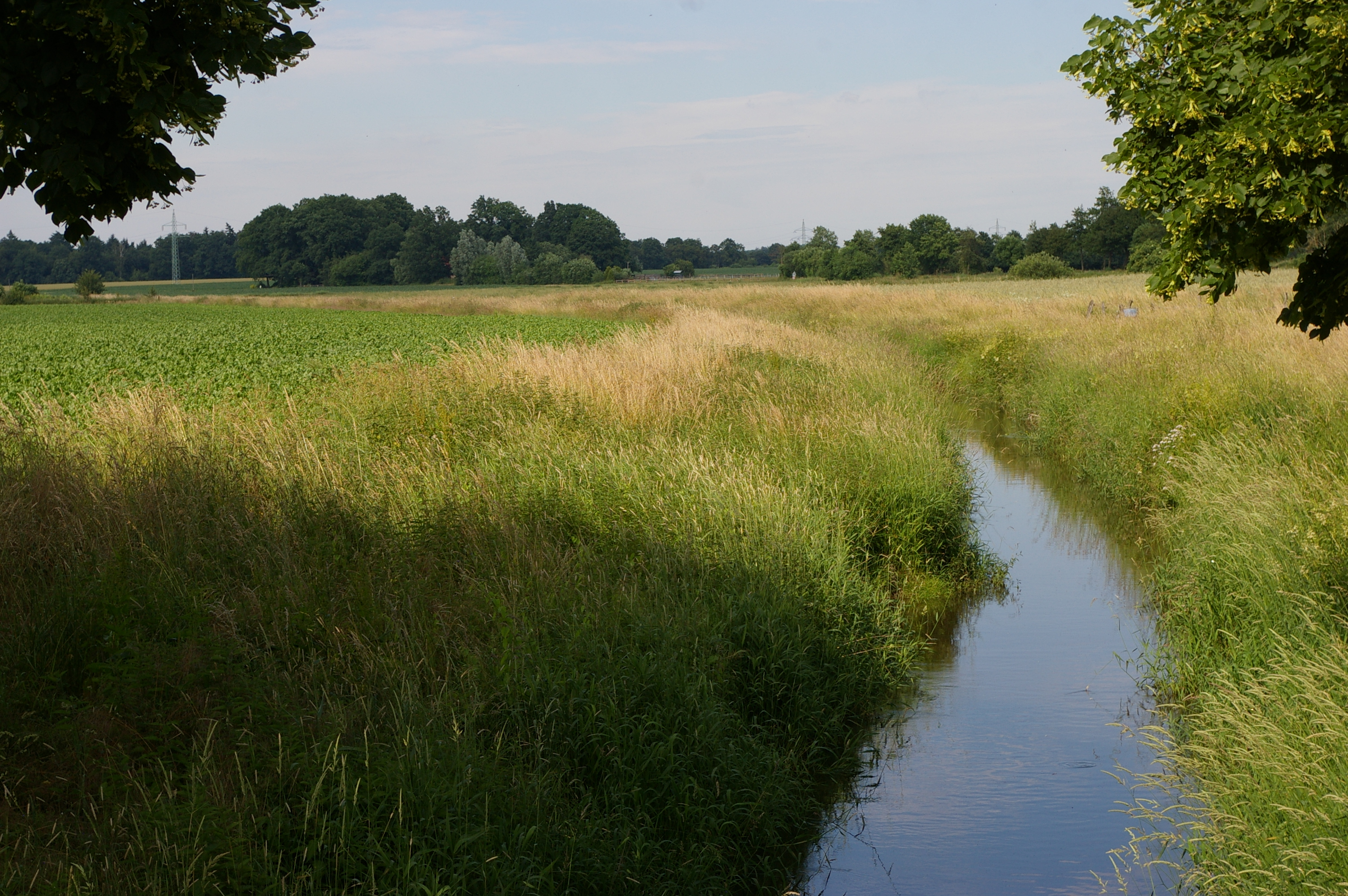
- The Siede in Siedenburg

Location
- Country: Germany
- State: Lower Saxony

Physical characteristics
- Source
  - location: Reihausen near Engeln
- Mouth
  - location: into the Große Aue
  - coordinates: 52°35′51″N 8°56′26″E
  - elevation: about 31 m above sea level (NN)
- Length: 24.6 km (15.3 mi)

Basin features
- Progression: Große Aue→ Weser→ North Sea
- Landmarks: Villages: Siedenburg

Siede (German pronunciation: [ˈziːdə]) is a river of Lower Saxony, Germany. It is a left-hand (northern) tributary of the Große Aue, about 25 kilometres (16 mi) long. It runs mainly through the southern part of the district of Diepholz and belongs to the Weser river system.

== Course ==
The Siede emerges near Reihausen in the village of Engeln in the parish of Bruchhausen-Vilsen. From its source, it flows in a southerly direction through the Samtgemeinde Siedenburg and its main municipality Siedenburg, to which it has given its name. It then leaves Diepholz district and discharges into the Große Aue in the district of Nienburg.

The tributaries of the Siede are the Kuhlenkamper Beeke (= upper and middle reaches of the Päpser Bach, the Speckenbach and the Eschbach.

== See also ==
- List of rivers of Lower Saxony
