= Hude =

Hude may refer to:

== People ==
- Anna Hude (1858–1934), first Danish woman to graduate as a historian
- Auguste Hude (1851-1888), French politician
- Henri Hude (born 1954), French author with the French magazine Commentaire
- Hermann von der Hude (1830–1908), German architect

== Places ==
- Hude, Lower Saxony, Germany
- Hüde, Lower Saxony, Germany
- Hude, Schleswig-Holstein, Germany
- Hude Ravne, Slovenia

== Other uses ==
- another name for the Dghwede language, spoken in Nigeria

== See also ==
- Hood (disambiguation)
- Hudde
