= Trinity Lutheran Church (Freistatt, Missouri) =

Trinity Lutheran Church, Freistatt, Missouri
- Location within Missouri
- 37°01′08″N 93°53′52″W
- Location: 207 N. Main Street; Freistatt, Missouri 65654
- Country: United States
- Denomination: Lutheran Church–Missouri Synod
- Website: www.trinity1874.com

History
- Founded: 1874

Administration
- District: Missouri District

Trinity Lutheran Church, in Freistatt, Missouri, is a member congregation of the Lutheran Church–Missouri Synod (LCMS) that was founded on September 8, 1874. Trinity Lutheran School was started at the following year. The current church building was constructed in 1954. The congregation received national attention when it was designated a "great church" by The Christian Century magazine in 1950.

== History ==
In the early 1870s, a group of German Lutherans settled Minnesota. However, they found the Minnesota climate too cold for their liking, and took up an offer from the Frisco Railroad to purchase land in southwestern Missouri for $6 per acre in 1873. They decided to name the new settlement Freistatt, which means "place of refuge", after the town of Freistatt in Lower Saxony, Germany.

During their journey from Minnesota, they had stopped at the headquarters of the LCMS in St. Louis and requested that an itinerant pastor be assigned to them. That pastor soon was holding services in the settlers' homes. The church was officially founded on September 8, 1874, and the next year the congregation constructed a parsonage and a church building, started a school, and called a permanent pastor.

The community grew with additional German settlers from Illinois, New York, Ohio, and Wisconsin. In 1883, a white frame church was built to replace the original structure.

In 1950, Trinity was designated a "great church" by The Christian Century magazine. The January 1, 1951, issue of Life magazine included the church as one of twelve "Great American Churches". At that time, every house in the village, which had a population of 132 at that time, contained members of the congregation. Further evidence as to the importance of the church to the community was that members lived in every farmhouse but one within five miles (8.0 km) of the church. The Christian Century published a followup article about the congregation in its December 1, 1993, issue, which its author, Randall Balmer, later included in his book Grant Us Courage: Travels Along the Mainline of American Protestantism.

In 1952, the congregation decided it needed a larger and more modern church building. Construction of the new building, of gray limestone quarried in Carthage, Missouri, was undertaken in 1954, at a cost of $200,000. The interior has wood paneling and a high-vaulted ceiling; stained glass windows on each side of the nave contain phrases from the Nicene Creed. This, the congregations third church building, was dedicated on January 9, 1955, and continues in use.

The congregation retained its reliance on the German language well into the 20th century. Up until the 1940s, church services were regularly held in German, and even in 1950 there were twice-monthly services in that language.

Trinity's cemetery adjoins the church. An unusual aspect of the cemetery is that burials are in chronological order of death rather than by family.

In 1950, the congregation had a membership of about 900 and church service attendance of 480. Both have declined in the years since then as young people have moved away from the largely rural area to larger towns and cities. In the early 1990s, membership was 695 and attendance was 315. By 2018, membership and average attendance were 536 and 192, respectively.

== School ==
The congregation established a school, with the pastor serving as the teacher, within the first year of its existence. The first dedicated teacher, Henry Nehrling, was called in 1883, at which time the enrollment was 65 students.

A new red brick school building was opened in 1927. Additions were constructed in 1959 and 2000.

In 1951, enrollment stood at 90 students, and had declined slightly to 82 in kindergarten through grade 8 by 1993. In 2018, there were 68 students in kindergarten through grade 8, with another 25 in pre-kindergarten.

In 1988, George H. W. Bush made a stop at the school during his presidential campaign to highlight his desire to be an "education president".
