= Wetschen =

- Municipality
- Location of Wetschen within Diepholz district
- Interactive map of Wetschen
- Location within Germany Location within Lower Saxony
- Coordinates: 52°37′N 08°27′E
- Country: Germany
- State: Lower Saxony
- District: Diepholz
- Municipal assoc.: Rehden

Government
  - Mayor: Karl Friedrich Dünnemann

Area
  - Total: 25.11 km^{2} (9.70 sq mi)
- Elevation: 44 m (144 ft)

Population (2025-12-31)
  - Total: 1,863
  - Density: 74.19/km^{2} (192.2/sq mi)
- Time zone: UTC+01:00 (CET)
  - Summer (DST): UTC+02:00 (CEST)
- Postal codes: 49453
- Dialling codes: 05446
- Vehicle registration: DH

Wetschen (German pronunciation: [ˈvɛtʃn̩]) is a municipality in the district of Diepholz, in Lower Saxony, Germany.

== See also ==
- Rehden Geest Moor, a local nature reserve
