= Freistatt, Missouri =

- Village
- Location of Freistatt, Missouri
- Coordinates: 37°1′17″N 93°53′47″W
- Country: United States
- State: Missouri
- County: Lawrence
- Founded: 1873
- Incorporated: 1884

Area
  - Total: 0.21 sq mi (0.55 km^{2})
  - Land: 0.21 sq mi (0.55 km^{2})
  - Water: 0 sq mi (0.00 km^{2})
- Elevation: 1,339 ft (408 m)

Population (2020)
  - Total: 179
  - Density: 844.9/sq mi (326.22/km^{2})
- Time zone: UTC-6 (Central (CST))
  - Summer (DST): UTC-5 (CDT)
- ZIP code: 65654
- Area code: 417
- FIPS code: 29-25912
- GNIS feature ID: 0718213

Freistatt is a village in Lawrence County, Missouri, United States. As of the 2020 census, Freistatt had a population of 179.

== History ==
Freistatt was laid out in 1873. The community was named by German settlers after the town of Freistatt in Lower Saxony, Germany. The settlers established Trinity Lutheran Church in 1874 and opened a Lutheran school in 1875, both of which remain important institutions in the village. The Freistatt post office was in operation from 1884 until 2013. It is now a private residence.

== Geography ==
Freistatt is located at 37°1′17″N 93°53′47″W (37.021322, -93.896449).

According to the United States Census Bureau, the village has a total area of 0.21 square miles (0.54 km^{2}), all land.

== Demographics ==
Historical population
Census	Pop.	Note	%±
1930	128		—
1940	132		3.1%
1950	135		2.3%
1960	172		27.4%
1970	115		−33.1%
1980	139		20.9%
1990	166		19.4%
2000	184		10.8%
2010	163		−11.4%
2020	179		9.8%
U.S. Decennial Census

=== 2010 census ===
As of the census of 2010, there were 163 people, 81 households, and 44 families living in the village. The population density was 776.2 inhabitants per square mile (299.7/km^{2}). There were 90 housing units at an average density of 428.6 per square mile (165.5/km^{2}). The racial makeup of the village was 89.6% White, 4.3% Native American, 0.6% Asian, 4.9% from other races, and 0.6% from two or more races. Hispanic or Latino of any race were 9.8% of the population.

There were 81 households, of which 24.7% had children under the age of 18 living with them, 40.7% were married couples living together, 9.9% had a female householder with no husband present, 3.7% had a male householder with no wife present, and 45.7% were non-families. 44.4% of all households were made up of individuals, and 28.3% had someone living alone who was 65 years of age or older. The average household size was 2.01 and the average family size was 2.80.

The median age in the village was 46.1 years. 20.9% of residents were under the age of 18; 4.2% were between the ages of 18 and 24; 22.1% were from 25 to 44; 26.4% were from 45 to 64; and 26.4% were 65 years of age or older. The gender makeup of the village was 50.9% male and 49.1% female.

=== 2000 census ===
At the 2000 census, there were 184 people, 79 households, and 50 families living in the village. The population density was 1,007.6 inhabitants per square mile (389.0/km^{2}). There were 86 housing units at an average density of 470.9 per square mile (181.8/km^{2}). The racial makeup of the village was 90.76% White, 1.63% Native American, 2.72% from other races, and 4.89% from two or more races. Hispanic or Latino of any race were 3.80% of the population.

Of the 79 households, 29.1% had children under the age of 18 living with them, 51.9% were married couples living together, 7.6% had a female householder with no husband present, and 36.7% were non-families. 34.2% of all households were individuals, and 26.6% had someone living alone who was 65 years of age or older. The average household size was 2.33 and the average family size was 3.02.

In the village, the population was 28.3% under the age of 18, 6.5% from 18 to 24, 27.7% from 25 to 44, 13.6% from 45 to 64, and 23.9% who were 65 years of age or older. The median age was 36 years. For every 100 females, there were 82.2 males. For every 100 females age 18 and over, there were 80.8 males.

The median income for a household in the village was $21,750, and the median income for a family was $35,938. Males had a median income of $25,357 versus $19,375 for females. The per capita income for the village was $10,757. About 16.3% of families and 18.1% of the population were below the poverty line, including 30.6% of those under the age of eighteen and 14.0% of those 65 or over.

== Climate ==
Climate is characterized by relatively high temperatures and evenly distributed precipitation throughout the year. The Köppen Climate Classification subtype for this climate is "Cfa" (Humid Subtropical Climate).
