= Wilhelm Ehmann =

- Born: 5 December 1904; Freistatt
- Died: 16 April 1989 (aged 84)
- Education: Freiburg University; Leipzig University
- Occupations: Musicologist; conductor; academic
- Awards: German Order of Merit

Wilhelm Ehmann (5 December 1904 – 16 April 1989) was a German musicologist, editor, church musician and conductor. He founded the choir Westfälische Kantorei that toured internationally and made many recordings. He was a cofounder and director of the later Hochschule für Kirchenmusik Herford.

== Career ==
Ehmann was born in Freistatt, the son of a dean at the Bethel Institution. After working as an elementary school teacher for a short time, he studied musicology at the universities of Freiburg and Leipzig, with Wilibald Gurlitt, among others. He was promoted to Ph.D. in Freiburg. He worked first as an assistant at the university and Gauchormeister of Baden. He joined the Nazi Party in 1937. From 1938, he was a private lecturer and editor of the magazine Deutsche Musikkultur. He also worked for the department of organ music at the Reichsjugendführung From 1940 to 1945, he was the head of the institute of musicology at the University of Innsbruck.

After World War II, he moved to Lippinghausen near Herford, where he was church musician of the village church. From 1948, he was Landeskirchenmusikwart (district head of church music) of the der Protestant Church of Westphalia and founded the Westfälische Landeskirchenmusikschule in Herford, which became the Hochschule für Kirchenmusik Herford in 1991. He was succeeded in 1976 by Uwe Karsten Groß. He was also a lecturer for church music at the University of Münster. He was on the boards of national and international institutions of church music, including the Arbeitskreis für Haus- und Jugendmusik from 1951, the Internationaler Arbeitskreis Musik from 1951, the Internationale Heinrich-Schütz-Gesellschaft from 1956, and Deutscher Musikrat from 1959. He died in Freiburg im Breisgau.

== Choral and brass music ==
Ehmann focused on performing choral sacred music and pursued historically informed performance early, recording works by Dieterich Buxtehude, Heinrich Schütz and Johann Sebastian Bach, among others. He also conducted works by more recent composers such as Hugo Distler and Ernst Pepping. He founded the Westfälische Kantorei (Westphalian Chorale) which became known internationally. He published introductions to choral conducting, such as Die Chorführung in 1968. He also inspired historically informed performance for brass ensembles, leading to reproductions of historic instruments. He published tutorials for brass music such as Die Bläserfibel from 1951, and also music for brass such as Alte Spielmusik für Bläser. He toured in Europe, the Near East and Far East, Africa and the US. In 1957 he founded the first record label focused on sacred music, Cantate, together with Carl Merseburger. He taught choral conductors in master classes, especially in the US and St. Moritz, Switzerland. His textbooks on choral conducting were translated to English.

== Awards ==
- Bundesverdienstkreuz 1. Klasse (9 July 1969)
- Honorary Doctor, Westminster Choir Princeton, US (1978)
