= Barver =

- Municipality
- Coat of arms

- Location of Barver within Diepholz district
- Interactive map of Barver
- Location within Germany Location within Lower Saxony
- Coordinates: 52°37′N 08°36′E
- Country: Germany
- State: Lower Saxony
- District: Diepholz
- Municipal assoc.: Rehden

Government
  - Mayor: Hans-Hermann Borggrefe

Area
  - Total: 25.9 km^{2} (10.0 sq mi)
- Elevation: 37 m (121 ft)

Population (2025-12-31)
  - Total: 1,019
  - Density: 39.3/km^{2} (102/sq mi)
- Time zone: UTC+01:00 (CET)
  - Summer (DST): UTC+02:00 (CEST)
- Postal codes: 49453
- Dialling codes: 05448
- Vehicle registration: DH

Barver is a municipality in the district of Diepholz, Lower Saxony, Germany.

== Geography ==
Barver is located midway between Bremen (54 km to the north-north-east) and Osnabrück (52 km to the south-west), northeast of the Dümmer and Rehden Geest Moor Nature Parks and south of the Wildeshausen Geest Nature Park. The village lies east of the Kellenberg ridge (77 m) and on the west bank of the Wagenfelder Aue, a south-eastern tributary of the Hunte.

== History ==
The first written reference to Barver dates from 1219.

== Town twinning ==
Barver has been twinned with the French commune of Lezay since August 1973.

== See also ==
- Rehden Geest Moor, a local nature reserve
