= Hemsloh =

- Municipality
- Location of Hemsloh within Diepholz district
- Interactive map of Hemsloh
- Location within Germany Location within Lower Saxony
- Coordinates: 52°36′N 08°31′E
- Country: Germany
- State: Lower Saxony
- District: Diepholz
- Municipal assoc.: Rehden

Government
  - Mayor: Werner Schlüter

Area
  - Total: 26.77 km^{2} (10.34 sq mi)
- Elevation: 58 m (190 ft)

Population (2025-12-31)
  - Total: 529
  - Density: 19.8/km^{2} (51.2/sq mi)
- Time zone: UTC+01:00 (CET)
  - Summer (DST): UTC+02:00 (CEST)
- Postal codes: 49453
- Dialling codes: 05448
- Vehicle registration: DH

Hemsloh is a municipality in the district of Diepholz, in Lower Saxony, Germany.

== See also ==
- Rehden Geest Moor, a local nature reserve
