= Eschbach (Siede) =

River in Lower Saxony, Germany

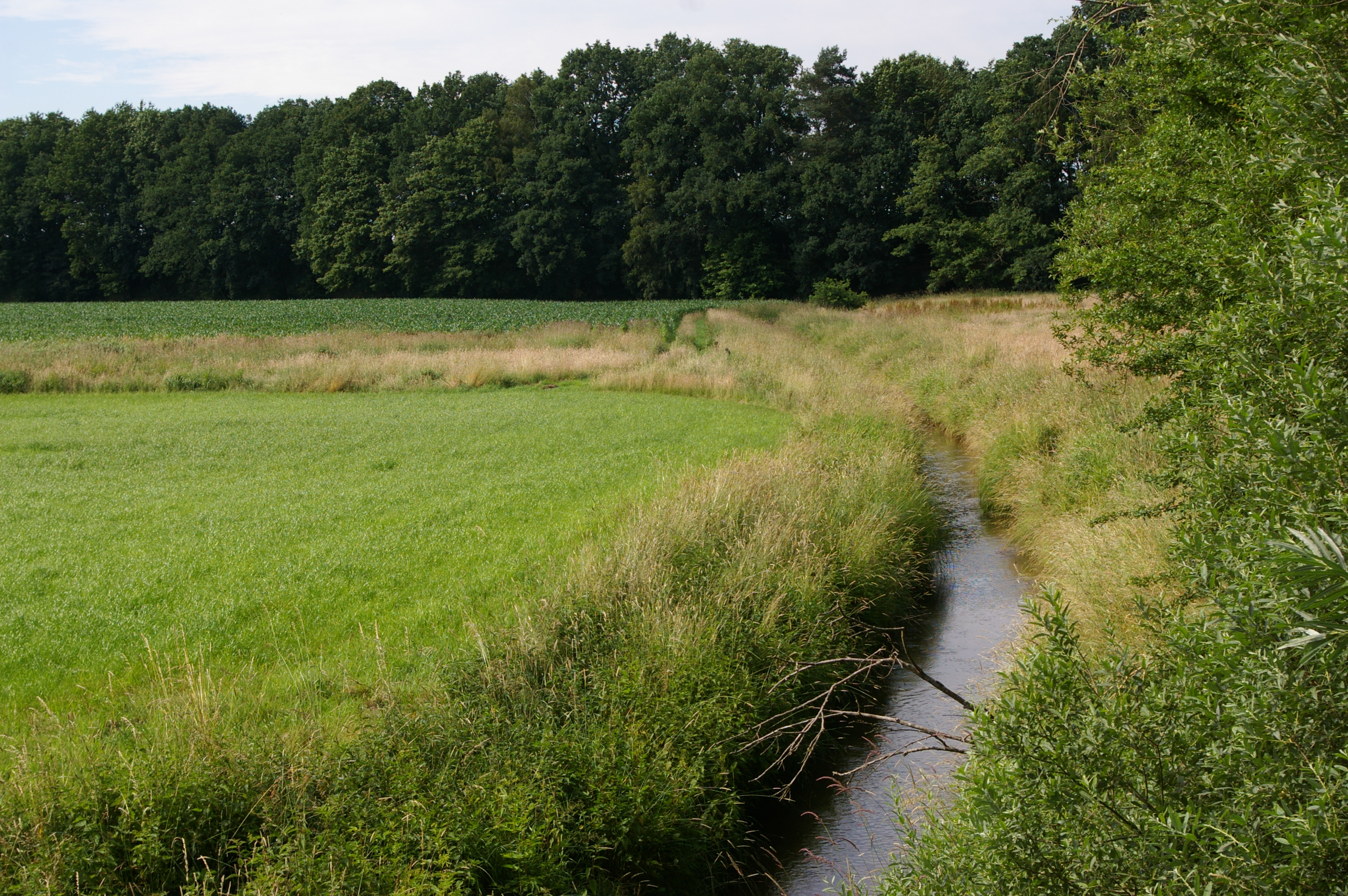

Location
- Country: Germany
- State: Lower Saxony

Physical characteristics
- Mouth
  - location: Siede
  - coordinates: 52.6755°N 8.9190°E
- Length: 12.8 km (8.0 mi)

Basin features
- Progression: Siede→ Große Aue→ Weser→ North Sea

Eschbach (German pronunciation: [ˈɛʃbax]) is a river of Lower Saxony, Germany. It flows into the Siede near Siedenburg.

== See also ==
- List of rivers of Lower Saxony
