= Carl's Railway =

Disused railway line in Germany

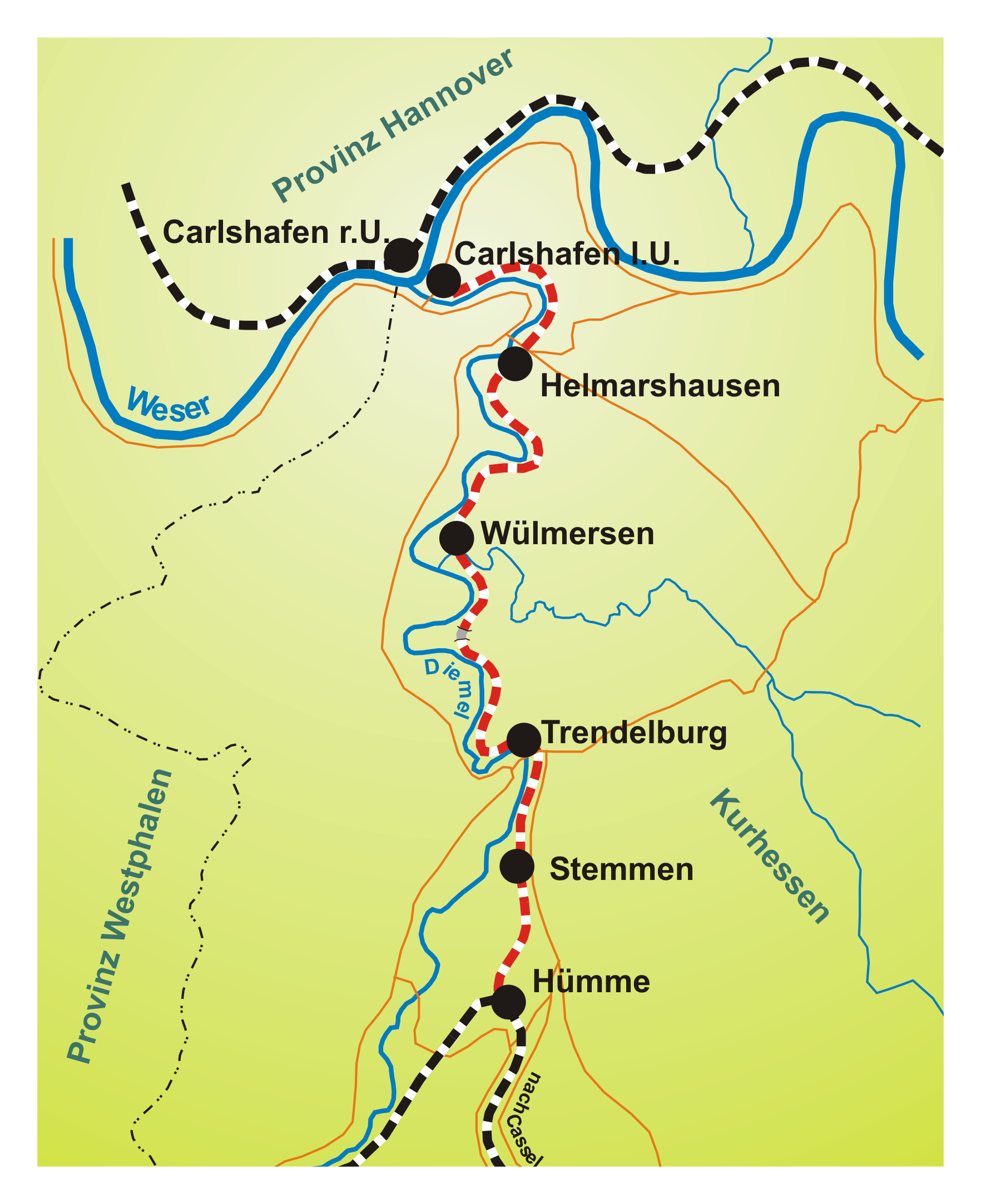

Overview
- Native name: Carlsbahn
- Locale: Hesse
- Termini: Bad Karlshafen (right bank); Hofgeismar-Hümme

Service
- Route number: ex 198d

History
- Opened: 1848
- Closed: 1986

Technical
- Line length: 16.5 km (10.3 mi)
- Track gauge: 1,435 mm (4 ft 8 1/2 in) standard gauge

Carl's Railway (German: Carlsbahn) is a disused railway line along the Diemel river between Hümme and Bad Karlshafen, which was opened on 30 March 1848 and finally closed on 27 September 1986. It was built as part of the northern section of the Frederick William Northern Railway; the rest of the northern section is now part of the Kassel–Warburg line.

The 16.5-kilometre-long (10.3 mi) single-track line was the only line in the Electorate of Hesse (Kurhessen) connecting to a port on the Weser. At that time the Fulda river had not yet been channelised and river boats could not reach Kassel. The Carl's Railway together with the Grebenstein–Hümme section of the Northern Railway was the first railway in Kurhessen and it was one of the oldest railways in Germany.

== History ==
On 6 August 1846 the body responsible for building the line was named the Elector Frederick William Northern Railway Corporation (Kurfürst-Friedrich-Wilhelms-Nordbahn Aktiengesellschaft). The line was named Carlsbahn after Bad Karlshafen, which was called Carlshafen until 1935. Its name means "Charles' Port" and it was named after Charles I (Hesse's ruler from 1670 to 1730) on its foundations by French Huguenots in 1699.

== Construction ==
The states of Saxe-Weimar-Eisenach, Saxe-Coburg and Gotha, Prussia and Kurhessen began negotiations in 1840 on the establishment of an east–west rail link between Westphalia and Halle. The main line would run between Kassel and Bebra through Kurhessen from Gerstungen in the east to Haueda, 14 kilometres (8.7 mi) west of Hümme on the border with Westphalia. Negotiations were completed in the autumn of 1841 and in 1844 the Elector Frederick William Northern Railway Corporation received the concession to construct the line. The concession stipulated that the company build a horse-hauled branch line from Kassel to Carlshafen. At that time river transport on the Weser was a major means of transport. In 1846 it was decided, however, that operations on the branch line would use steam locomotives, instead of horse-haulage.

The branch line to Carlshafen opened on 30 March 1848 at the same time as the 11.5 kilometres (7.1 mi) section of the Gerstungen–Kassel–Haueda main railway between Hümme and Grebenstein. These two routes were the first railway lines opened in the Electorate of Hesse.

== Route ==
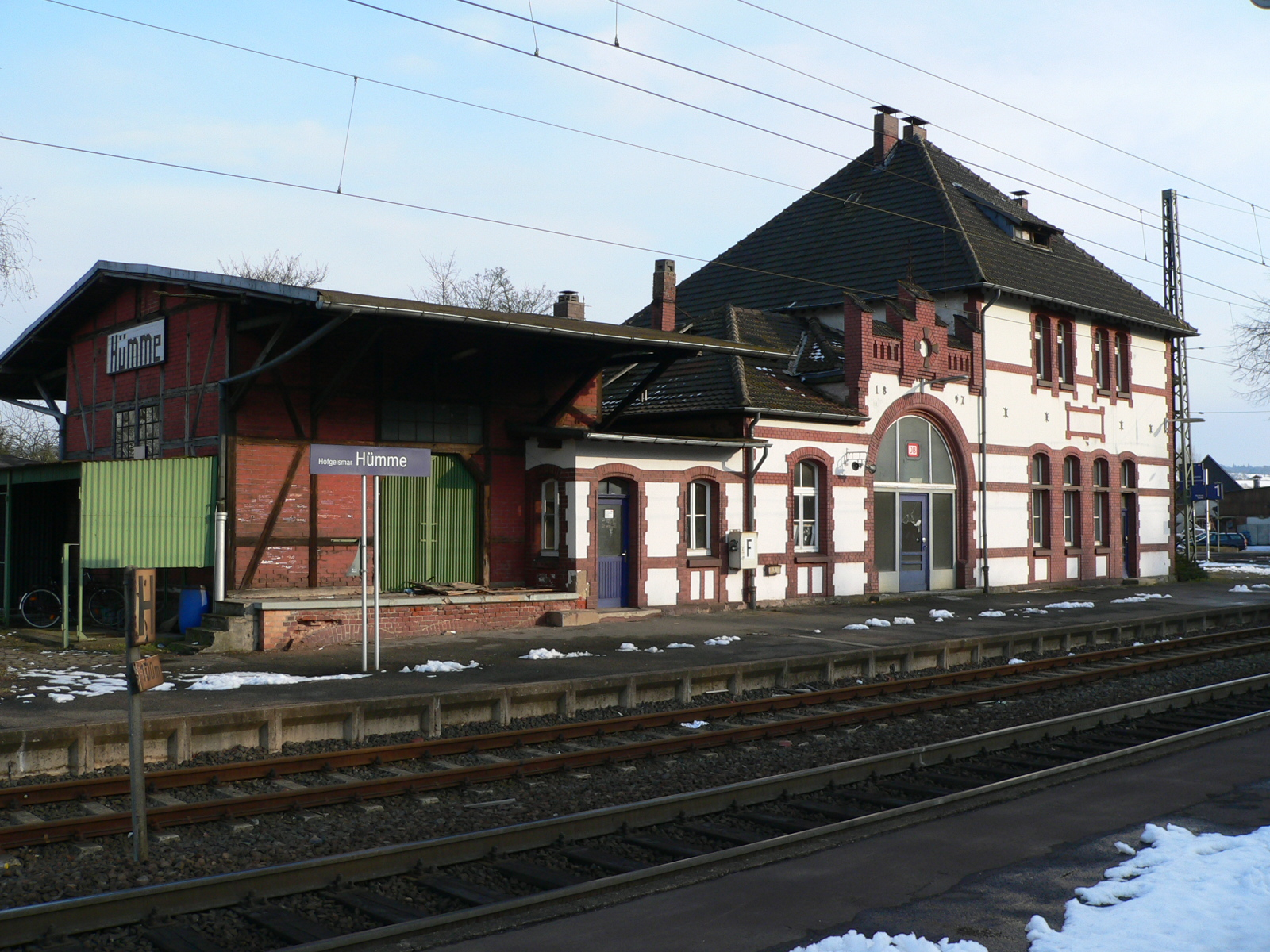
Hofgeismar-Hümme station

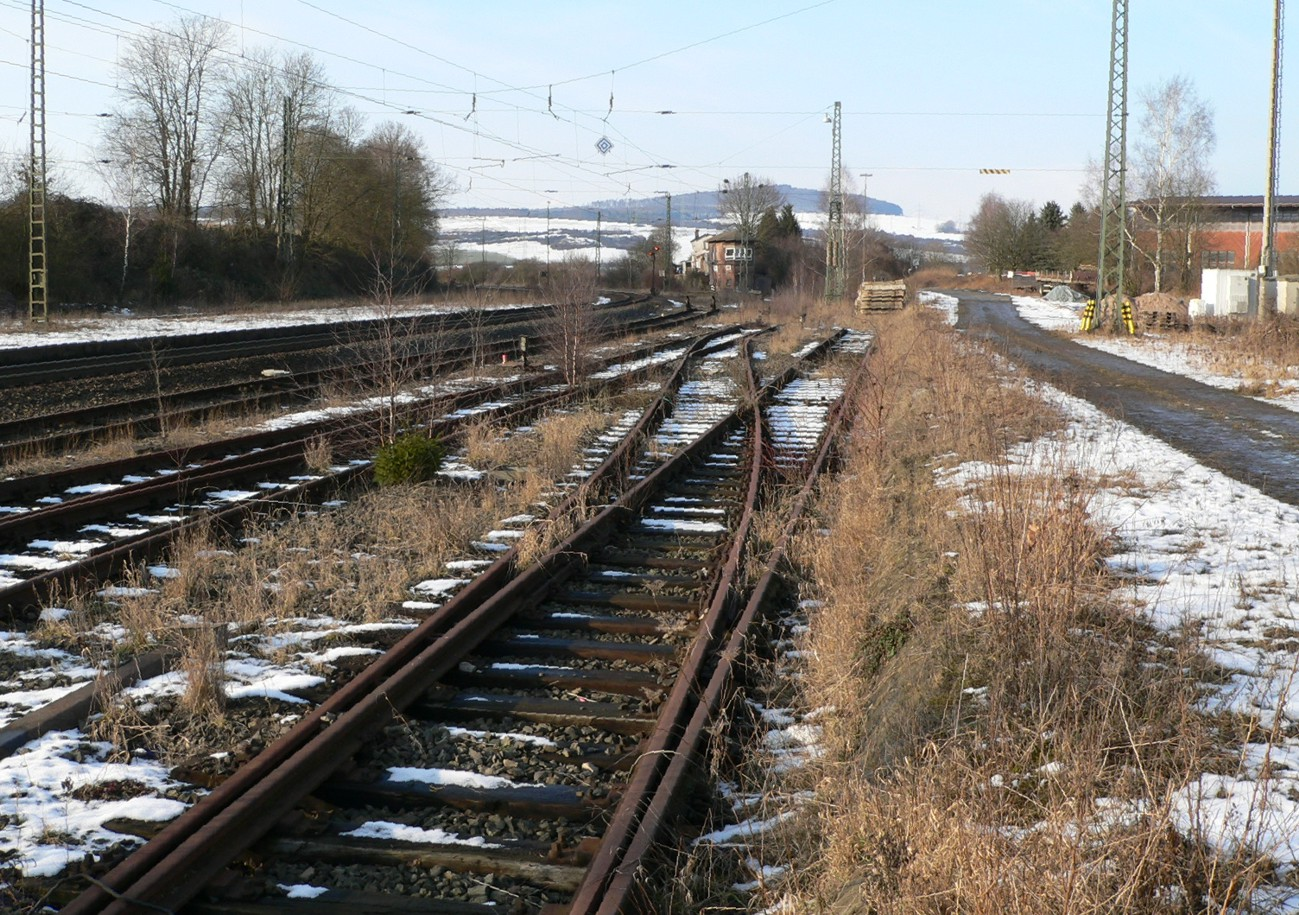
Former Carl's Railway junction on Kassel–Warburg line

The Carl's railway branched off the main Kassel–Warburg line at the northern end of Hümme station. The 16.5-kilometre-long (10.3 mi) branch line was a single-track line in contrast to the main line. Its maximum grade was 1:100, its sharpest curve had a radius of 201 metres (659 ft). The line ran above the right (eastern) bank of the Diemel on the western slope of the Reinhardswald. Its major structures were the 202-metre-long (663 ft) Deisel Tunnel between Trendelburg and Wülmersen that passed through the Kesselberg mountain, thus avoiding the Diemel valley flood plain, and a triple-arched viaduct over the Holzape, one of the streams that starts in the Reinhardswald. Stations were opened at Trendelburg (population of 1,014 at the opening of the line) and Helmarshausen (1,207) and Carlshafen (1,652 in the inner town). The line ran parallel to the Diemel through Karlshafen to the Weser port. The right-angled turn between the approach line and the Weser quay was overcome by two turntables.

== Operations ==
Initially there were only two pairs of trains a day on the line. From 1 August 1848, there were three pairs of trains a day for two years. The journey between Hümme and Karlshafen took between 35 and 40 minutes. In 1851 the Kingdom of Hanover joined the German Customs Union, so the port of Hann. Münden, which was closer to Kassel, came to be preferred for river transport. In parallel, river traffic on the upper Weser, which was strongly affected by changes in water levels, was significantly impacted by the opening of the Hanoverian Southern Railway in 1856 from Göttingen via Hann. Münden to Kassel. The cargo handled at the Weser quay in Karlshafen in 1863 was only 19,024 tonnes (18,724 long tons; 20,970 short tons).

In order to overcome the decline in traffic, an extension of the line from Karlshafen was discussed. Preliminary negotiations took place in 1864 with a British bank for financing this project, but were not completed. In 1866, following the Austro-Prussian War, the political situation changed fundamentally with the annexation of Kurhessen and Hanover by Prussia.

=== Prussian period ===
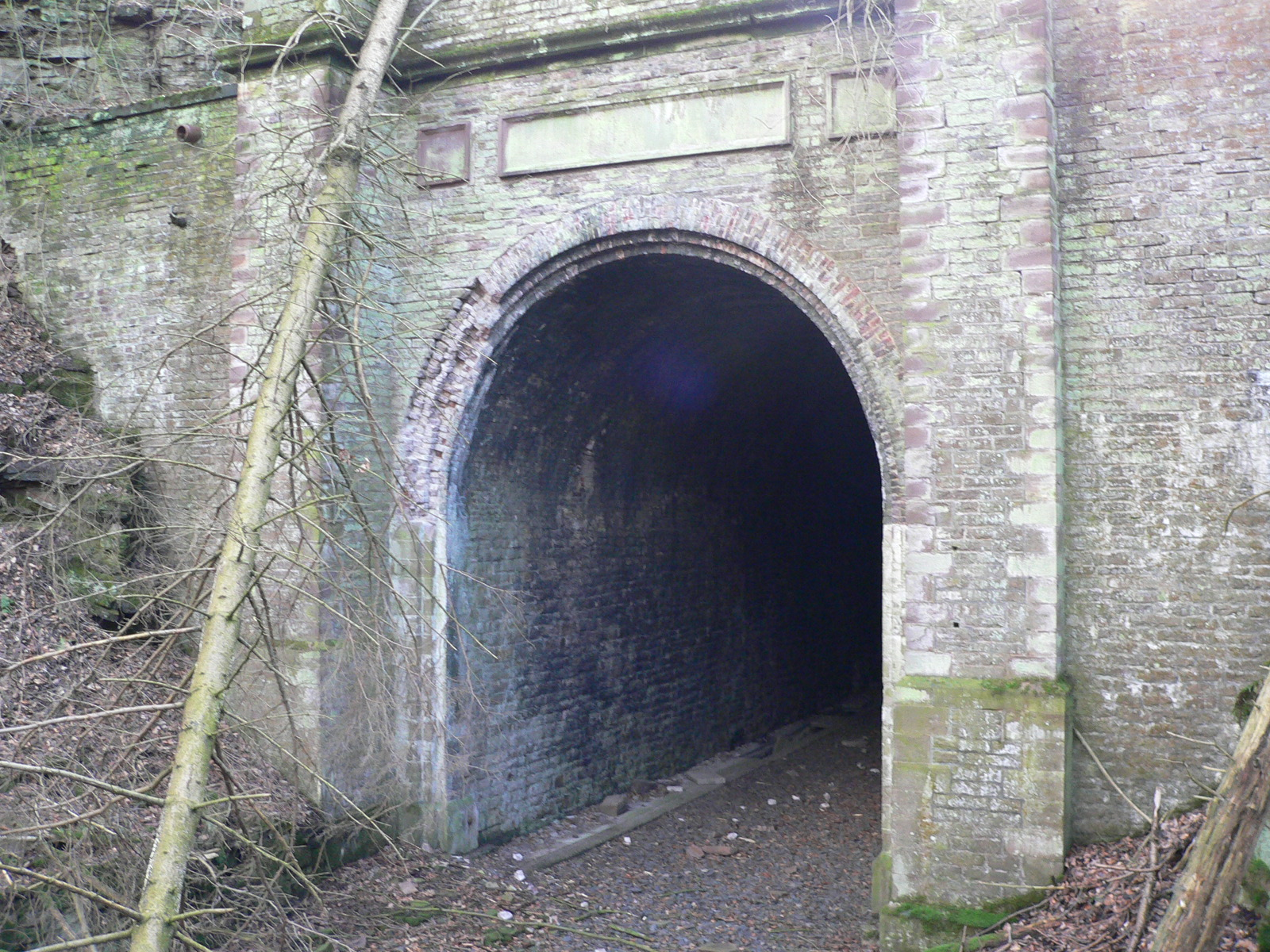
Carlsbahn Tunnel 2006

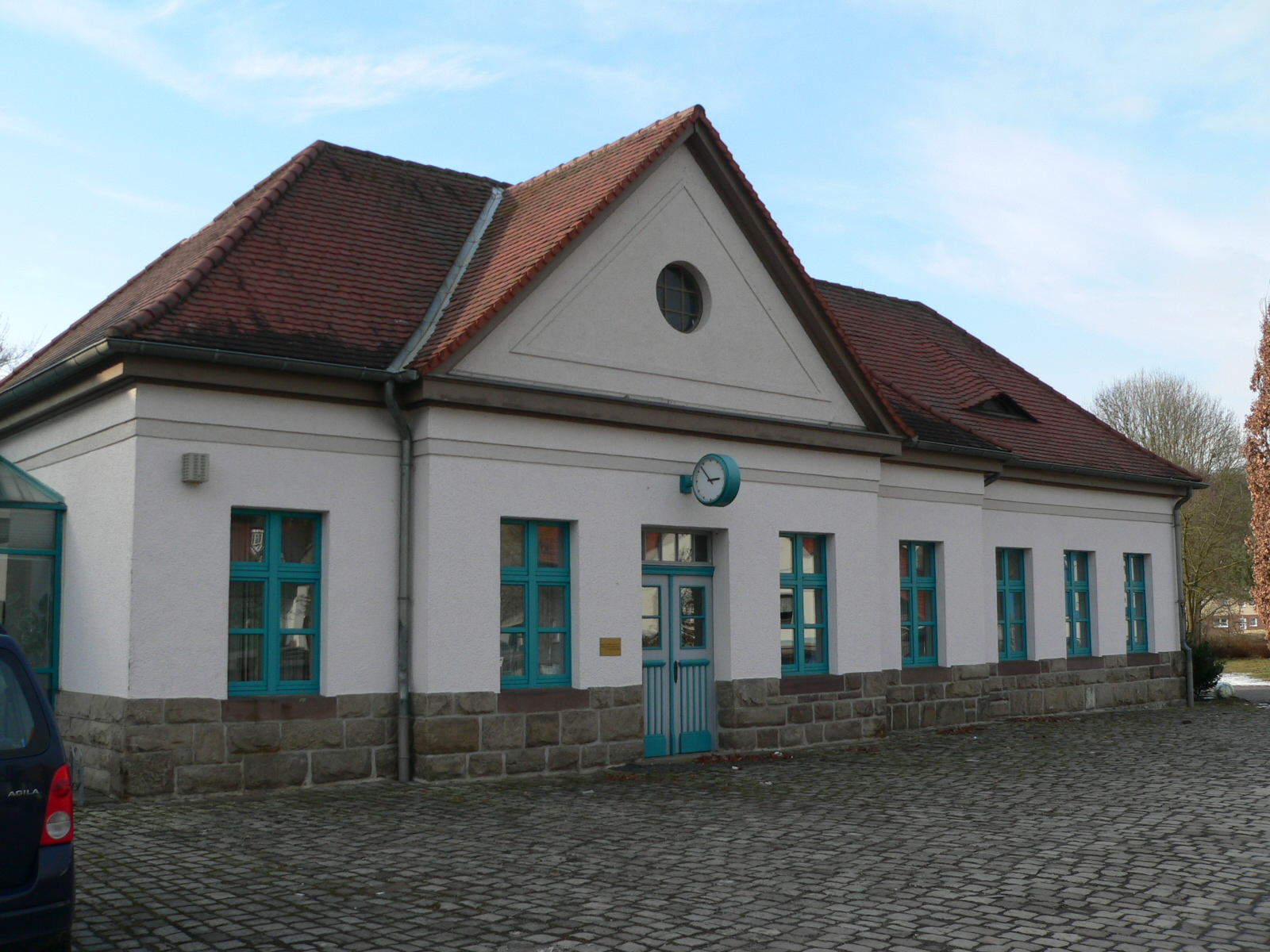
Former Trendelburg station of 1914

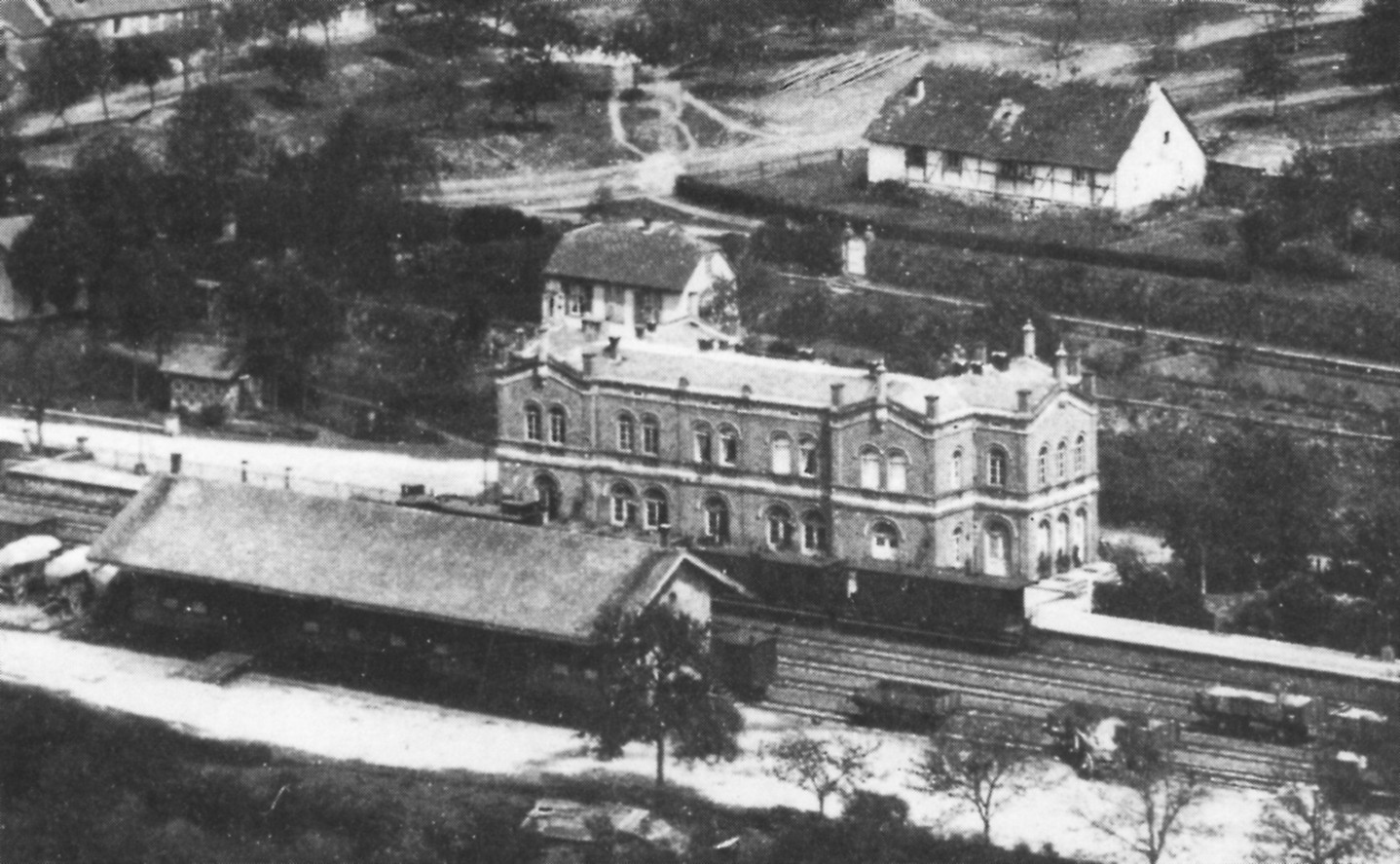
Former Carlshafen left bank station in 1877

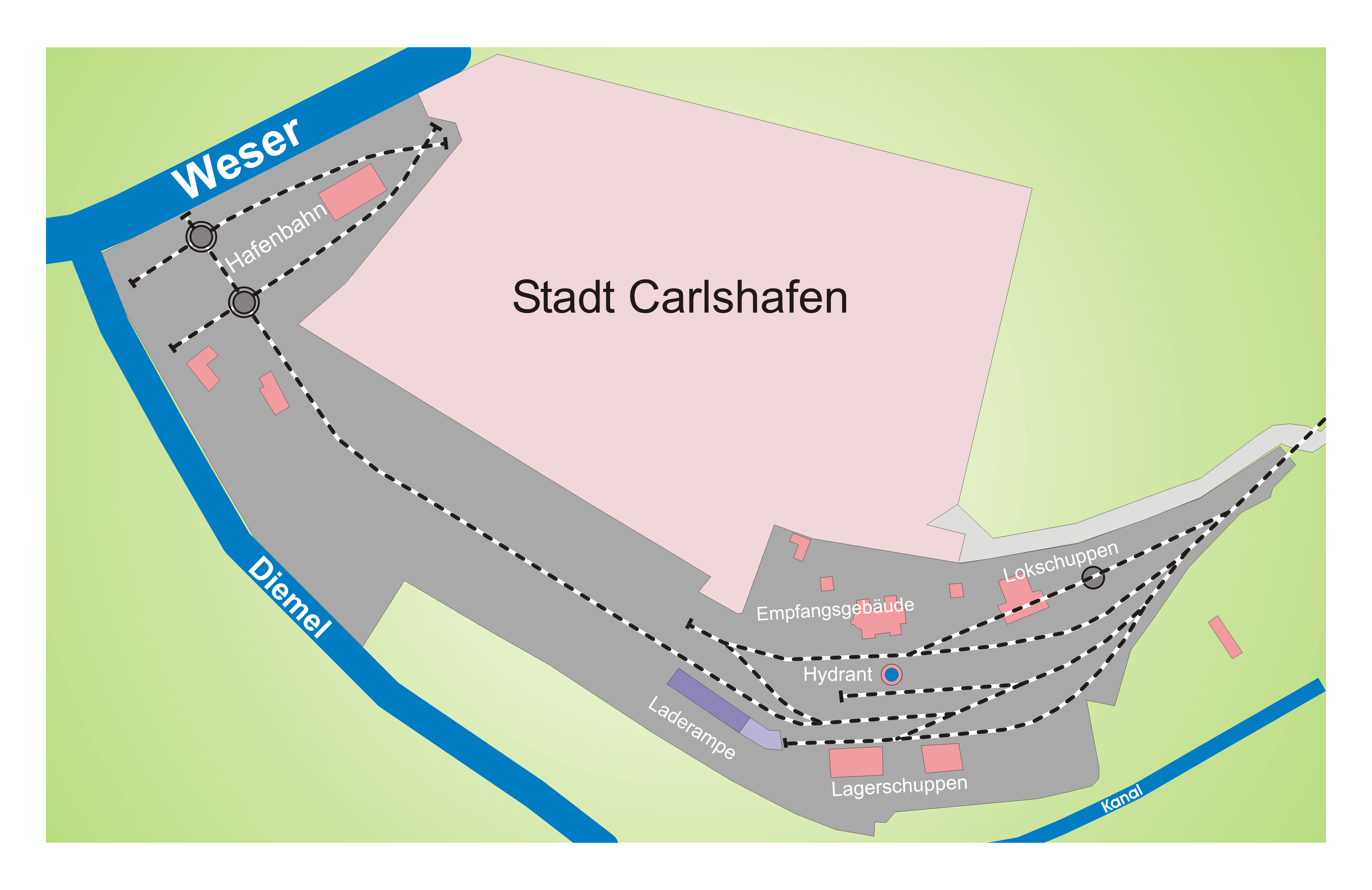
Track plan of former Carlshafen station

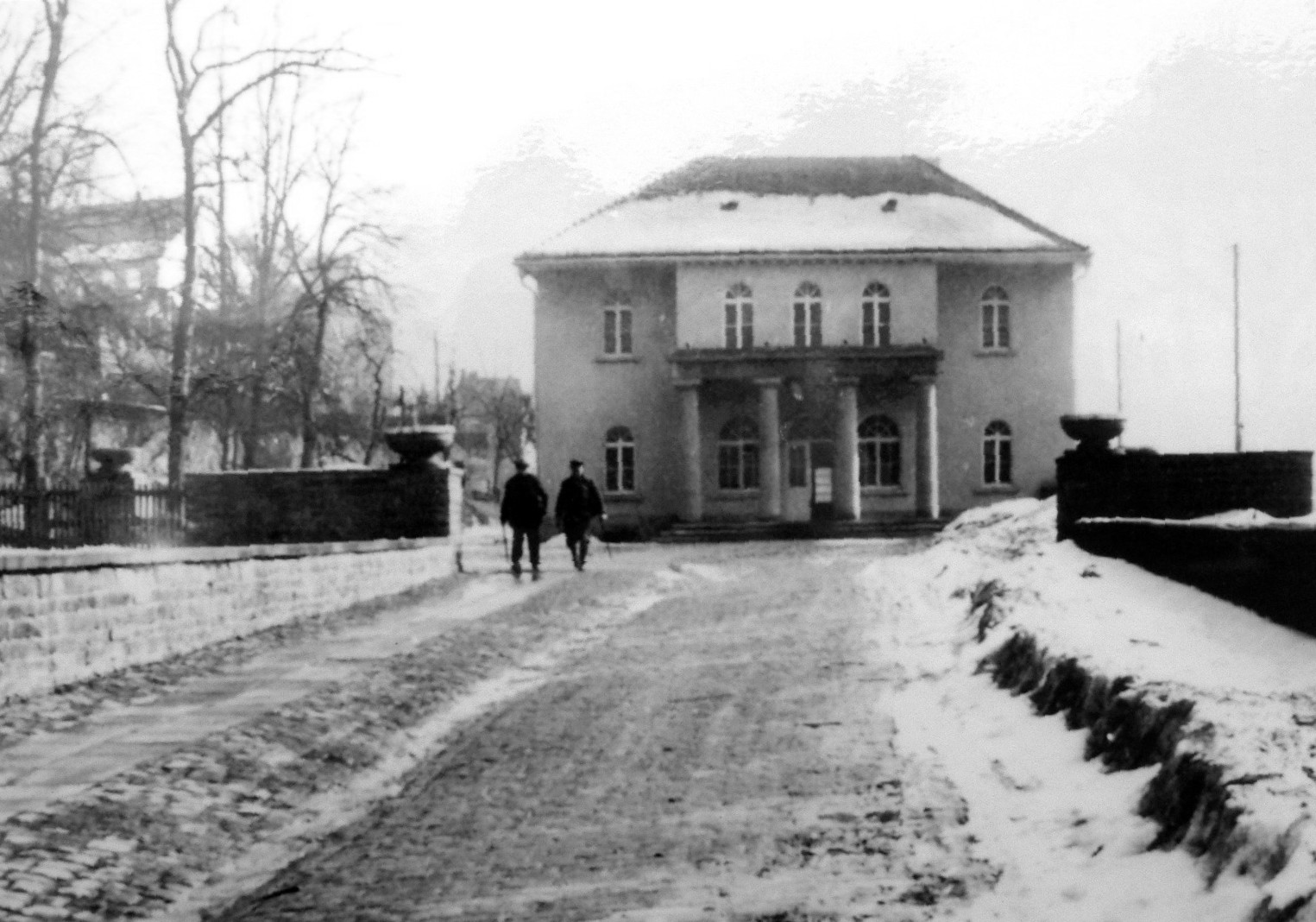
Former Carlshafen left bank station after reconstruction and down-sizing in the 1920s, side view

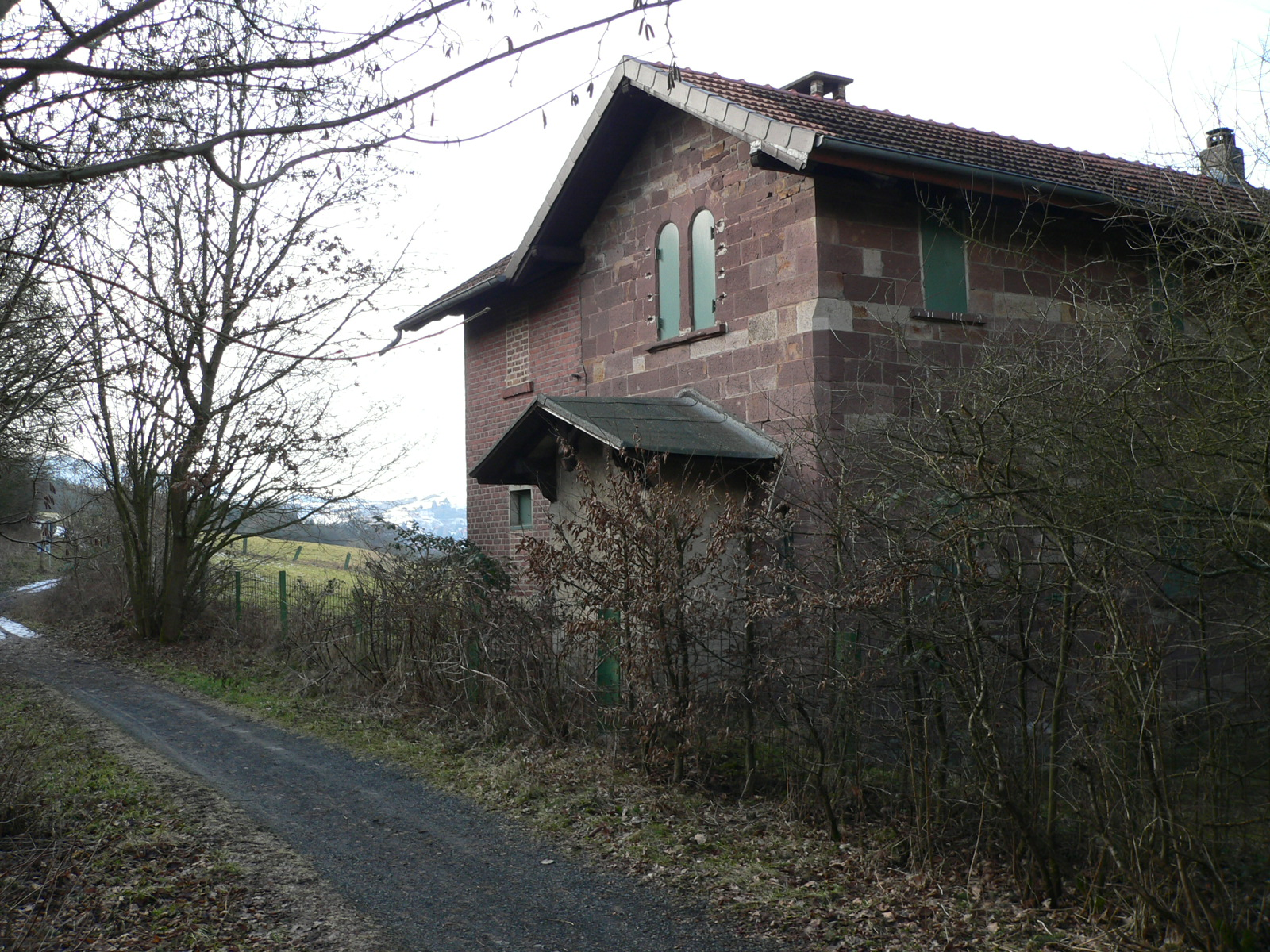
Tunnel keeper's house

The Prussian administration had a significant impact on the Elector Frederick William Northern Railway Corporation and hence to Carl's Railway. The company was renamed the Hessian Northern Railway (Hessische Nordbahn) and it planned to build a line from Karlshafen via Detmold and Herford to Lemförde. On 1 April 1867, the Northern Railway headquarters was established in Kassel. In 1868 the Northern Railway was taken over by the Bergisch-Märkische Railway Company (BME) and in 1873 it took over the operation of the lines. On 1 January 1882 the BME was nationalised by the Prussian government.

Although the BME planned several variations of an eastward extension of Carl's Railway between 1873 and 1878, these always failed due to lack of funds. In 1873 the Royal Westphalian Railway Company received a concession for a second line through Karlshafen. This line, the Solling Railway, was opened in 1878 and quickly became a very important east–west trunk route for freight. It passed through Karlshafen on the eastern (or northern at this point) bank of the Weser, where a station was built, which was never connected to the Carl line on the opposite bank. In order to avoid confusion between the two Karlshafen stations, the station on Carl's Railway was suffixed Left Bank (Linkes Ufer, l.U.) and the station on the Solling Railway was suffixed Right Bank (Rechtes Ufer, r.U.).

In the 1870s there was a modest volume of traffic Carl's Railway with two pairs of trains each day. Subsequently, there was a gradual increase to seven pairs of trains in 1914. However, this involved the increased use of mixed trains with passengers and freight with extended travel times of up to 50 minutes. Pure passenger trains took 33 minutes thanks to a speed limit of 50 kilometres per hour (31 mph) imposed in 1904 for secondary lines.

In 1895 a halt was established between Hümme and Trendelburg in Stammen and in 1899 a halt was opened on the Wülmersen estate.

=== Reichsbahn period ===
The absorption of the state railways in 1918 into the newly formed Deutsche Reichsbahn (German State Railroad) took place during severe political and economic crises that directly affected the Carl's line. The frequency of trains had been reduced during the First World War and on 15 January 1924 reduced again to only three daily pairs of trains. Multiple units took over passenger operations. The Reichsbahn attempted to economise by closing Stammen and Wülmersen stations, or at least reduce the number of trains stopping there, which led to widespread protests. After a new examination of profitability this decision was finally rescinded. Only with the 1925 summer timetable did the situation improve. Until 1938, the frequency increased again gradually to up to seven pairs of trains a day. Some trains were operated from and to Kassel. Four pairs of trains were made up of multiple units.

=== Period after the Second World War ===
Carl's line was not damaged in the Second World War. In the spring of 1946, daily services consisted of only one pair of passenger-only trains and on weekdays an additional pair of mixed passenger and goods trains, which did not stop in Stammen. These two pairs of trains did not travel every day. From the 1949 summer timetable, there were six pairs of trains on weekdays and five on Sundays and public holidays. Some trains again ran to and from Kassel.

In the 1950s, Carl's line had up to nine trains running in each direction. The running time was reduced to less than 30 minutes and many trains ran through to and from Kassel.

Around 1950, the extension of the Carl's Railway to connect with the Northeim–Ottbergen–Altenbeken line was again discussed; this would have required the construction of an approximately 530-metre-long (1,740 ft) tunnel. The unfavourable topographical conditions in Karlshafen created difficulties, however, and it was decided to cater for the north–south long-distance freight traffic on the Warburg–Altenbeken route by construction a bypass curve at Altenbeken station to the Hamm–Warburg line.

With the dieselisation of lines, passenger operations were generally carried out using diesel railbuses. At times, class V 36 diesel shunting locomotive hauled passenger trains.

From 1963 rollingstock used included class 86 locomotives, class ETA 150 accumulators railcars with control cars, single-engine rail buses of class VT 95 with control cars and diesel railcars of class VT 60 with control cars.

Freight on the Carl's Railway at this time was limited and was handled by a class Köf II shunting locomotive to/from Hümme station. The permissible load between Hümme and Trendelburg was 200 tonnes (200 long tons; 220 short tons), on the remaining section of the line it was only 100 tonnes (98 long tons; 110 short tons). Railway sidings existed in Karlshafen (Weserhafen), in Wülmersen (estate) and Trendelburg (sand quarries).

== Closure ==
On 25 September 1966, the last passenger service ran on the Carl's Railway and freight operations closed on the eleven kilometre-long Trendelburg–Karlshafen section. The closure was justified by the deterioration and safety of the track base. Funds were not available for its rehabilitation. Freight operations between Trendelburg and Hümme closed on 27 September 1986.
