= Bahrenborstel =

- Municipality
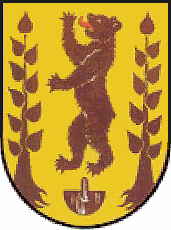
- Coat of arms

- Location of Bahrenborstel within Diepholz district
- Interactive map of Bahrenborstel
- Location within Germany Location within Lower Saxony
- Coordinates: 52°34′N 08°49′E
- Country: Germany
- State: Lower Saxony
- District: Diepholz
- Municipal assoc.: Kirchdorf

Government
  - Mayor: Heinz Albers

Area
  - Total: 31.28 km^{2} (12.08 sq mi)
- Elevation: 44 m (144 ft)

Population (2025-12-31)
  - Total: 1,108
  - Density: 35.42/km^{2} (91.74/sq mi)
- Time zone: UTC+01:00 (CET)
  - Summer (DST): UTC+02:00 (CEST)
- Postal codes: 27245
- Dialling codes: 04273
- Vehicle registration: DH

Bahrenborstel (German pronunciation: [ˈbaːʁənˌbɔʁstl̩]; Low German: Boornbössel) is a municipality in the district of Diepholz, in Lower Saxony, Germany.

It lies between the Dümmer Nature Park and the Steinhuder Nature Park, and roughly between Bremen and Minden. Approximately 7 km south of the community is the Great Moor. A few kilometers northwest runs a section of the Great Aue.
