= Kirchdorf, Lower Saxony =

Kirchdorf
- Municipality
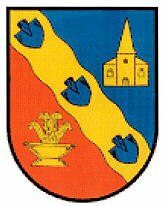
- Coat of arms

- Location of Kirchdorf within Diepholz district
- Interactive map of Kirchdorf
- Location within Germany Location within Lower Saxony
- Coordinates: 52°35′41″N 8°50′10″E
- Country: Germany
- State: Lower Saxony
- District: Diepholz
- Municipal assoc.: Kirchdorf
- Subdivisions: 15 Ortsteile

Government
  - Mayor: Franz Böckmann

Area
  - Total: 47.8 km^{2} (18.5 sq mi)
- Elevation: 36 m (118 ft)

Population (2025-12-31)
  - Total: 2,191
  - Density: 45.8/km^{2} (119/sq mi)
- Time zone: UTC+01:00 (CET)
  - Summer (DST): UTC+02:00 (CEST)
- Postal codes: 27245
- Dialling codes: 04273
- Vehicle registration: DH
- Website: www.kirchdorf.de

Kirchdorf (German pronunciation: [ˈkɪʁçdɔʁf]) is a municipality in the district of Diepholz, in Lower Saxony, Germany. It is situated approximately 30 km east of Diepholz, and 35 km north of Minden.

Kirchdorf is also the seat of the Samtgemeinde ("collective municipality") Kirchdorf.
