= Borstel, Lower Saxony =

Borstel
- Municipality
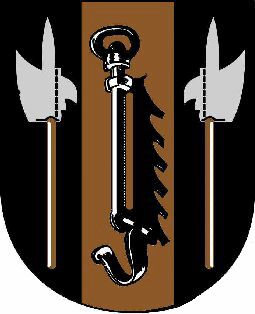
- Coat of arms

- Location of Borstel within Diepholz district
- Interactive map of Borstel
- Location within Germany Location within Lower Saxony
- Coordinates: 52°40′N 08°59′E
- Country: Germany
- State: Lower Saxony
- District: Diepholz
- Municipal assoc.: Siedenburg
- Subdivisions: 4 Ortsteile

Government
  - Mayor: Dieter Engelbart

Area
  - Total: 31.08 km^{2} (12.00 sq mi)
- Elevation: 53 m (174 ft)

Population (2025-12-31)
  - Total: 1,162
  - Density: 37.39/km^{2} (96.83/sq mi)
- Time zone: UTC+01:00 (CET)
  - Summer (DST): UTC+02:00 (CEST)
- Postal codes: 27246
- Dialling codes: 04276
- Vehicle registration: DH
- Website: www.borstel-online.de

Borstel (German pronunciation: [ˈbɔʁstl̩]; Low German: Bössel) is a municipality in the district of Diepholz, in Lower Saxony, Germany.
