= Diepholz Moor Depression =

Designations

Ramsar Wetland
- Official name: Diepholzer Moorniederung
- Designated: 26 February 1976
- Reference no.: 86

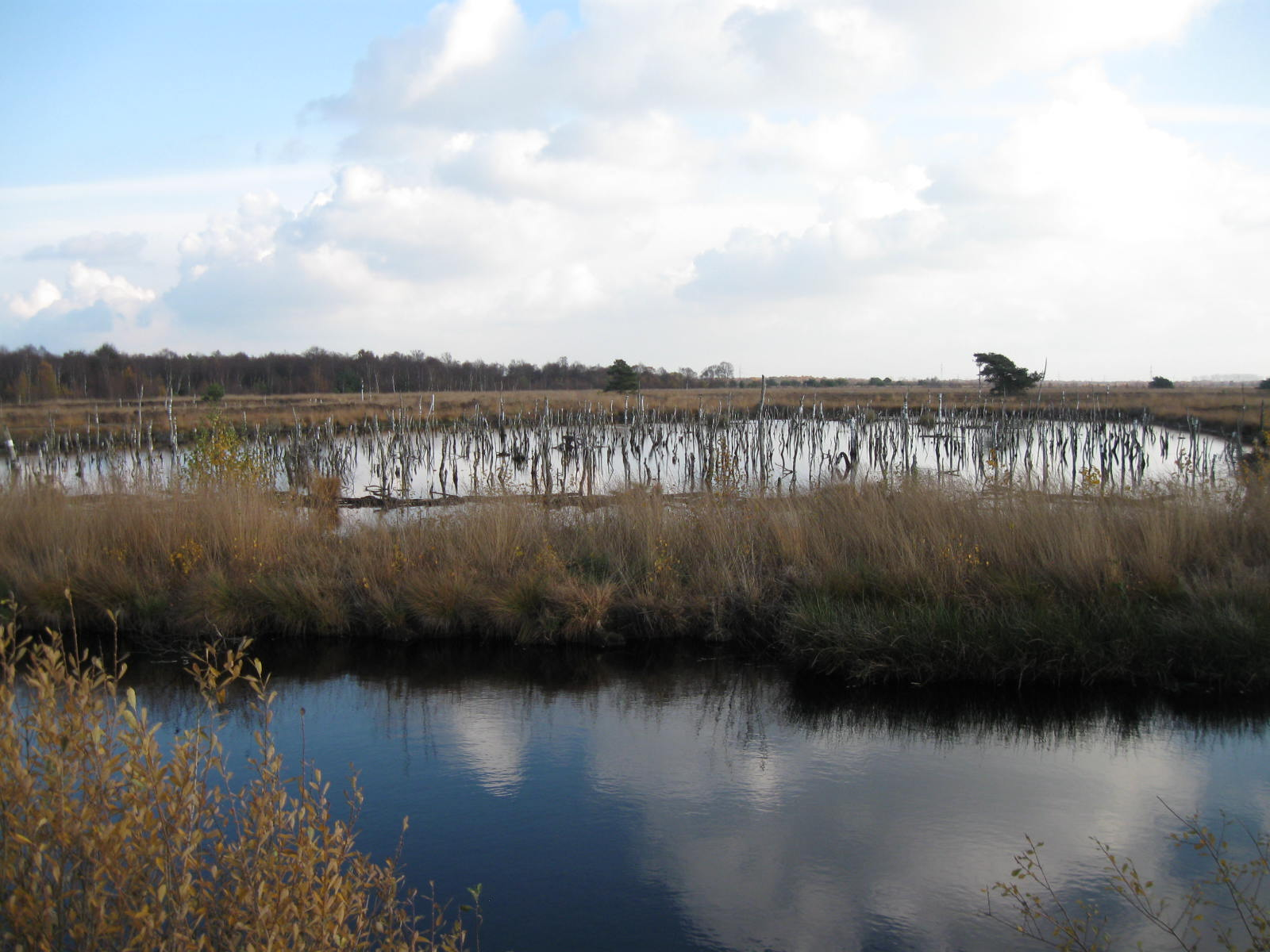
The Rehden Geest Moor, typical raised bog in the Diepholz Moor Depression

The Diepholz Moor Depression (German: Diepholzer Moorniederung) has a total area of around 105,000 ha and incorporates numerous smaller and larger nature reserves and protected landscapes. The region includes 24,000 ha of raised bogs (geological definition), divides into 15 raised bogs, as well as the Dümmer and its depression in the southwest.

== Location ==
The Diepholz Moor Depression lies within the triangle formed by the cities of Bremen, Osnabrück and Hanover, predominantly within the state of Lower Saxony with a small part in the state of North Rhine Westphalia. It is a shallow sandy valley depression on the southern perimeter of the North German Plain with only a few, more prominent geest ridges.
