= Lichtburg =

Name of various German cinemas

Lichtburg ("fortress of light" or "light castle") has been a popular name for cinemas in Germany. Those in Berlin, Essen and Düsseldorf have been particularly famous; the Lichtburg in Oberhausen is the site of the International Short Film Festival Oberhausen, and Quernheim is the smallest municipality in Germany with a cinema, also called Lichtburg.

== Düsseldorf ==
The Düsseldorf Lichtburg opened on 5 November 1910 as the "Lichtspiele Königsallee" (Königsallee Moving Pictures, for the name of the street). It was designed by Oskar Rosendahl, a local architect who the following year published an influential article in Der Kinomatograph in which he laid out guidelines for cinema design such as an inviting foyer with cloakrooms through which the public would be drawn rapidly into the auditorium, an equally good view from all seats, achieved by a raked floor and a screen raised at least 2.5 metres off the floor, and toilets within easy reach to minimise disturbances.

The cinema was renamed the Union in 1915, the Titania in 1928, the U.T. (Union Theater) Königsallee in 1931, and finally the Lichtburg, also in 1931. Throughout its years as a cinema, the façade retained a stone archway over the doorway and a group of small windows above. The semicircular canopy bore the name Lichtburg in large letters, changing position and script slightly over the years. The neon letters came to embody the cinema. Immediately after World War II, it was an AKC cinema for American and British occupying forces, with only limited access for locals. It originally had a balcony and a total of 1,000 seats, but in the 1970s was tripled into Lichtburg 1, Lichtburg 2, and Studio Lichtburg. These were renovated in the 1990s to seat 205, 176 and 112 respectively.

It closed on 29 December 2004 despite a petition with 15,000 signatures. On 4 February 2004, the façade had been awarded protected status as an architectural landmark by the City of Düsseldorf. A commemorative plaque was placed in the pavement in front of its former location. The Lichtburg Studio Theater, a cellar arthouse cinema opened in 2005, revived the name but was itself forced to close in 2009.

== Essen ==
51°27′17″N 7°0′47″E

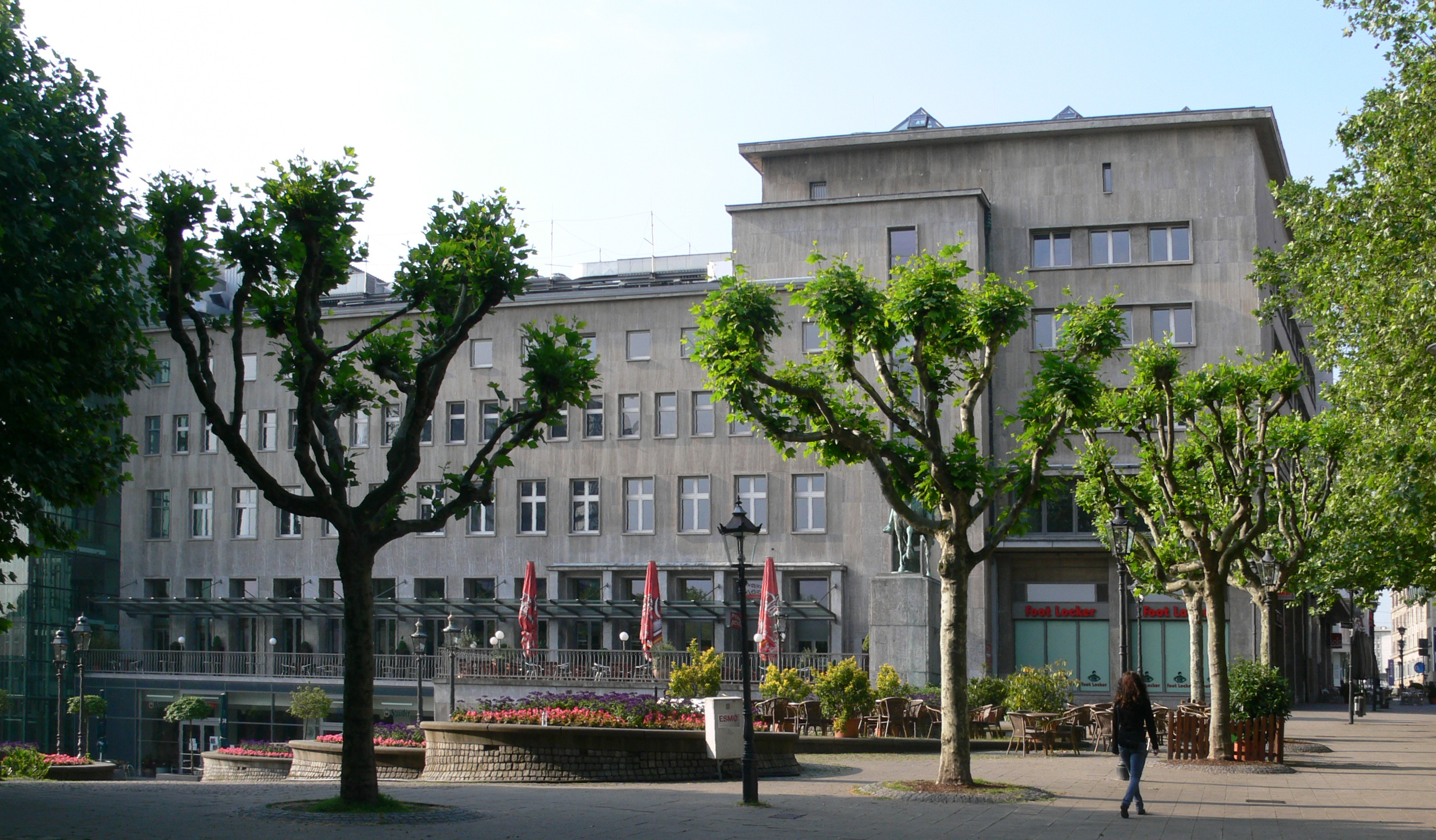
The rebuilt Essen Lichtburg

The Lichtburg in Essen was built as a result of the city general plan of 1924, which included the redevelopment of the Burgplatz in the city centre by Die Burgplatz-Bau AG, a consortium of city government and private investors, to include a large new cinema within an office building, in order to give the city centre "urban flair". The exterior was designed by municipal planner Ernst Bode in a stark New Objectivist style without surface adornment; the interior by the local company of Heydkamp und Curt Bucerius based on designs by the city architect, Lothar Kaminski. The building had a 20-metre dome, at the time the largest in a German theatre. It had 2,000 upholstered seats with an electrical system which sent a message to the cashier when the seat was occupied, and a 150,000 Reichsmark Wurlitzer organ, at the time the largest in any European cinema, with sound effects including traffic noise and thunder. The 30-person orchestra was drawn in part from the Gürzenich Orchestra. The cinema opened on 18 October 1928: evening dress was requested from those attending the multi-part gala, which included a concert performance and a ballet by a Parisian troupe from the Folies Bergère before the featured film, Marquis d'Eon, der Spion der Pompadour.

Under the Third Reich, the Lichtburg's operator, Karl Wolffsohn, a Berlin publisher and entrepreneur, was forced as a Jew to sell it in 1933/34 for a tenth of its value to Universum Film AG (UfA). He and his family fled to Palestine in 1939 and he did not live to see the end of his lawsuit for recompense. In 2006 a memorial plaque was placed on the building; Wolffsohn's nephew, the historian Michael Wolffsohn, was present at the unveiling and heads the Berlin Lichtburg-Stiftung (Lichtburg Foundation), among whose projects is a German-Turkish-Jewish cultural centre.

During World War II, the building was almost completely destroyed by Allied bombing in 1943. The auditorium was completely destroyed by fire, but the walls remained standing.

Responding to a newspaper advertisement placed by the city of Essen, Heinrich Jaeck and Erich Menz, who had run several cinemas in the city, became the new operators almost two years after the war. In 1948–50, the cinema was rebuilt in contemporary style, with approximately 1,700 seats. It reopened on 23 March 1950; the mayor, Hans Toussaint, gave a speech and Gustav Heinemann, later to be President of the Republic, and Willi Forst, the director of the featured film, Wiener Mädeln, were both present.

In the 1950s, the Lichtburg in Essen was the foremost cinema for film premières in Germany. Its importance declined with the increasing popularity of television and increasing economic hardship in the Ruhr region. However, unlike most cinemas in Essen, it survived as a result of its size and stage facilities. In 1991 the German cinema chain CinemaxX opened the largest multiplex in Germany nearby. The building was in need of renovations and in 1994 it was suggested it should instead be demolished and the central site used in some other way. In 1998 the Essener Filmkunsttheater GmbH (Essen Cinema Art Theatre) acquired the building and it received landmark protection. After advocacy by cultural and political figures including Wim Wenders, Wolfgang Niedecken und Gerhard Schröder, the city council passed a resolution in 2000 to retain it as a cinema. It was decided to relocate a folk high school and investors were found. The building was comprehensively rebuilt to historic building standards in 1950s style in a 7 million Euro project. The tea room became the film bar and the 1970s Atelier-Theater became the Blue Salon. The college building was designed by Hartmut Miksch and Wolfgang Rücker. The college now uses most of the office space in the Lichtburg building itself. The cinema reopened on 16 March 2003 and now has modern sound and video equipment and is once again the site of many premières.

The main auditorium seats 1,250 and is still the largest cinema auditorium in Germany. The stage behind the screen enables the space to also be used for theatrical and cabaret performances. The small secondary auditorium below ground level seats 150 and is named for the Indian-American actor Sabu.

== Berlin ==
52.5502°N 13.3875°E

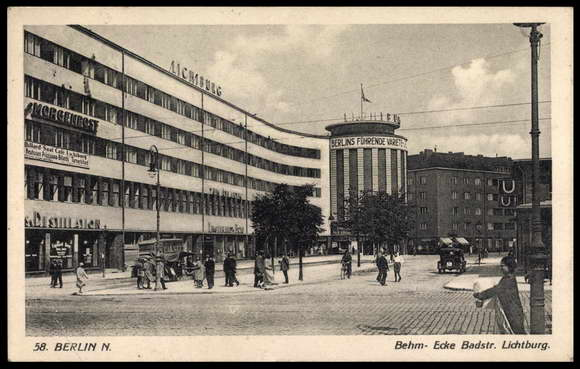
Lichtburg complex, 1931

The Lichtburg in Berlin opened on Christmas Day in 1929. It was designed by Rudolf Fränkel as the centrepiece of his Gartenstadt Atlantic housing development in Gesundbrunnen (Fränkel's first project as an independent architect) and was next to the Gesundbrunnen station. It seated 2,000 and was part of an entertainment complex which also contained spaces for dancing and banqueting, meeting rooms, restaurants, bars, cafes, shops and a bowling alley. It was one of the most important cinemas in Germany.

Architecturally, the Berlin Lichtburg was of international significance. The building was distinguished by the interplay of verticals and horizontals and recalled works by other avant garde architects of the period such as Erich Mendelsohn in its expressive use of curves and mostly horizontal divisions. It consisted of two horizontally defined wings, 5 and 4 storeys high, between which the main body of the cinema was located. A 22.5 metre high rotunda positioned at the street corner contained the foyer and event spaces and was topped by a glass roof pavilion; the cinema was given pride of place. In the auditorium, the decor featured mahogany, wine-red upholstery and swooping curves. The new building received praise in the architectural press for its innovative and successful technical realisation and use of space, including two-sided access to the cloakrooms so that entering and leaving people did not hinder each other.

The Berlin Lichtburg was also a prime example of German architecture of the night (Architektur der Nacht) or Light Architecture (Licht-Architektur). At night, the rotunda's 15 vertical bands of windows were illuminated by approximately 1,500 light bulbs each, red illuminated letters 1.2 metres high spelled out "Lichtburg" above the roofline, and 3 rotating searchlights mounted on the roof raked the sky from under them. In addition to drawing attention to itself amongst the residential buildings, the building thus embodied the principle of cinema – the projection of light into the darkness. The night-time appearance of the cinema was widely depicted and probably influenced Cecil Clavering's striking design for the Odeon in Kingstanding, with its tall central fins on which the architect originally intended a searchlight to be mounted.

During the Nazi period, the singer Walter Kirchhoff operated the building as an opera venue. In 1937, with the aid of American Jewish investors, Karl Wolffsohn, the former owner of the Essen Lichtburg, gained financial control of the Gartenstadt Atlantic in an attempt to remain operator of the Berlin Lichtburg, but in 1939 he was stripped of it under Nazi policy.

The building was badly damaged late in World War II. Soviet occupying forces then used the foyer to stable their horses. It received basic repairs and reopened in 1947 as the Corso, initially presenting operettas. In 1961 it was redesigned by M. A. Elsner. In this incarnation it had 1,933 seats and was less tall and more modestly decorated. Its location in the French sector of occupied Berlin, close to the border with the Soviet sector, attracted large audiences from East Berlin until the building of the Berlin Wall divided the city, after which the isolated location of the district led to the closure of the cinema in 1962. The Berlin Senate used the building to store food as part of the Senate Reserve, but in 1970 it was demolished to make way for redevelopment. It is now commemorated in the Lichtburgforum, which is named for it and attempts to replace some of its functions in the community, and the Lichtburg-Stiftung (Lichtburg Foundation), which was founded to finance cultural activities in the Gartenstadt Atlantic.

== Oberhausen ==
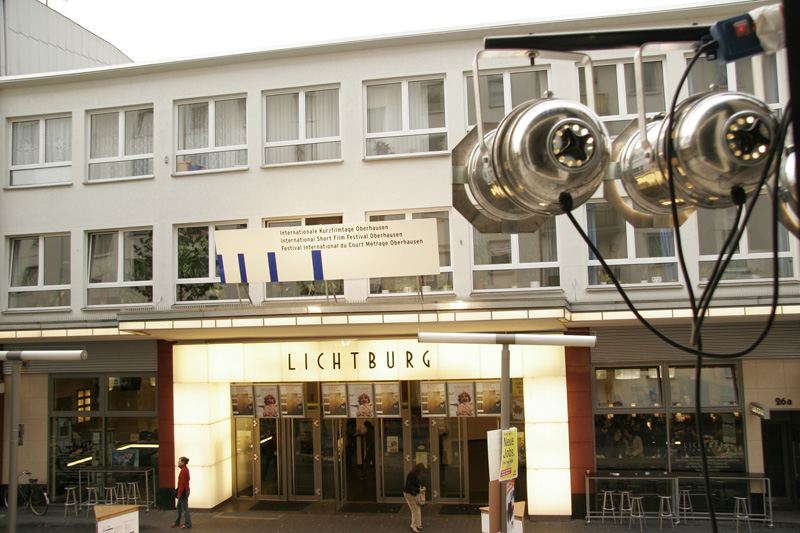
Entrance to the Lichtburg Filmpalast in Oberhausen

The International Short Film Festival Oberhausen, founded in 1954, moved in 1998 into the Lichtburg Filmpalast, which has 5 auditoria: the Lichtburg, Gloria, Sunset, Star and Studio. The cinema opened on 13 March 1931 with 1,200 seats. It was destroyed by bombing in World War II. In 1949 the "Little Lichtburg" opened; this later became the Gloria. On 13 May 1952 the new Lichtburg opened with 872 seats arranged for optimal viewing, 150 of them with extra-deep upholstery. The auditorium also has a theatrical stage. The Movie opened in 1974, with only 65 seats; the Star opened in 1986.

== Quernheim ==
With fewer than 500 inhabitants, Quernheim is the smallest settlement in Germany to have a cinema: the Lichtburg Filmtheater. The cinema opened on Christmas Day in 1952 and has had a second auditorium added. Since 1982, there has been a showing of The Blues Brothers every Good Friday, which people attend in costume.

== Ulm ==
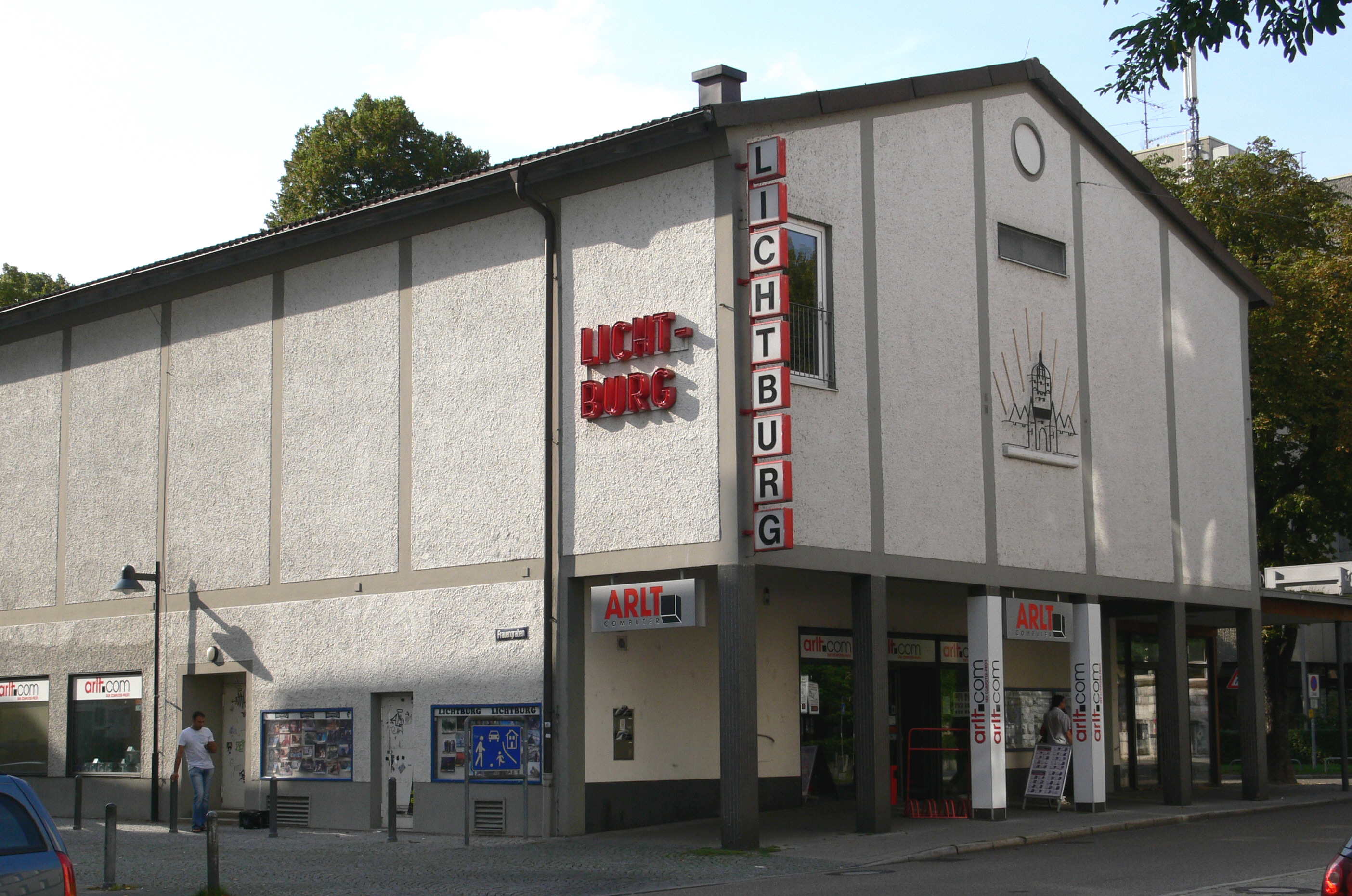
The Lichtburg Ulm cinema is located at Frauenstraße 61.

The Lichtburg Ulm cinema opened in 1952 and was operated by Adolf Mutschler and Albert Leipold. It can now accommodate 224 visitors and has 1 screen that is on a 13th century wall. The newer part of the building was designed by the architect Friedrich Maurer. In 1954 the cinema was accepted into the "Gilde der Filmkunst-Theater." Heinz Riech and his group took over operation in the 70's. Then Independent filmmakers took back the operations in 2000. The cinema was completely renovated in 2011 and is now Ulm's traditional cinema.
