= Stuhr =

- Municipality
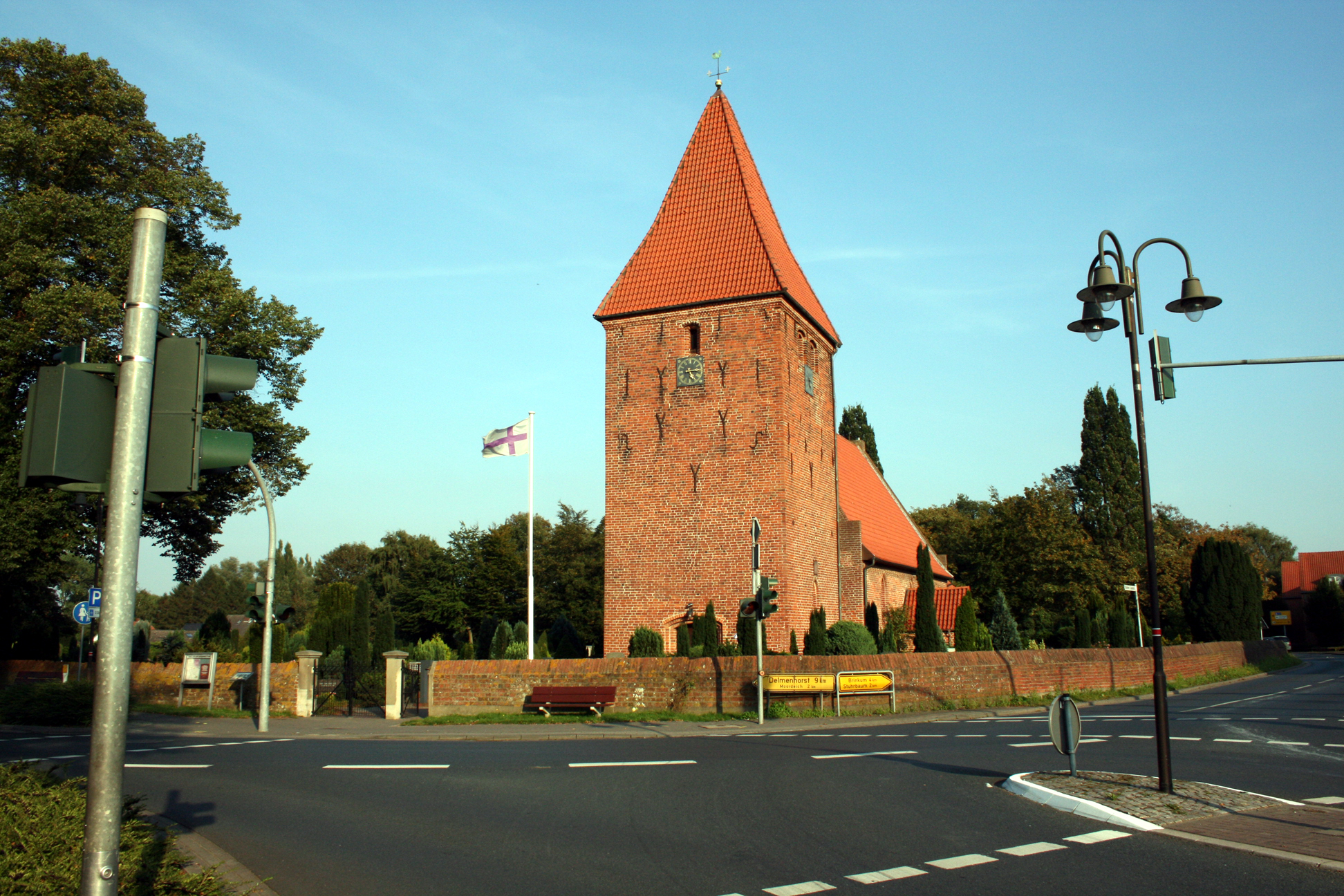
- Church

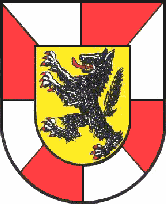
- Coat of arms

- Location of Stuhr within Diepholz district
- Interactive map of Stuhr
- Location within Germany Location within Lower Saxony
- Coordinates: 53°01′N 08°45′E
- Country: Germany
- State: Lower Saxony
- District: Diepholz

Government
  - Mayor (2019–24): Stephan Korte

Area
  - Total: 81.83 km^{2} (31.59 sq mi)
- Elevation: 20 m (66 ft)

Population (2025-12-31)
  - Total: 34,052
  - Density: 416.1/km^{2} (1,078/sq mi)
- Time zone: UTC+01:00 (CET)
  - Summer (DST): UTC+02:00 (CEST)
- Postal codes: 28816
- Dialling codes: 04206, 0421, 04221
- Vehicle registration: DH

Stuhr (German pronunciation: [ʃtuːɐ̯]) is a municipality in the district of Diepholz, in Lower Saxony, Germany. It is situated approximately 7 km southwest of Bremen. The biggest cities in Stuhr are Brinkum, Fahrenhorst, Groß Mackenstedt, Heiligenrode (Neukrug), Moordeich, Seckenhausen, Stuhr and Varrel. The most populous of these is Brinkum.

== Twin towns – sister cities ==
Stuhr is twinned with:

- Alcalá de Guadaíra, Spain
- Écommoy, France
- Ostrzeszów, Poland
- Sigulda, Latvia
