= Dickel =

- Municipality
- Location of Dickel within Diepholz district
- Interactive map of Dickel
- Location within Germany Location within Lower Saxony
- Coordinates: 52°39′N 08°29′E
- Country: Germany
- State: Lower Saxony
- District: Diepholz
- Municipal assoc.: Rehden

Government
  - Mayor: Heinrich Gödke

Area
  - Total: 16.98 km^{2} (6.56 sq mi)
- Elevation: 37 m (121 ft)

Population (2025-12-31)
  - Total: 484
  - Density: 28.5/km^{2} (73.8/sq mi)
- Time zone: UTC+01:00 (CET)
  - Summer (DST): UTC+02:00 (CEST)
- Postal codes: 49453
- Dialling codes: 05445
- Vehicle registration: DH

Dickel (German pronunciation: [ˈdɪkl̩]) is a municipality in the district of Diepholz, in Lower Saxony, Germany.
