= Maasen =

- Municipality
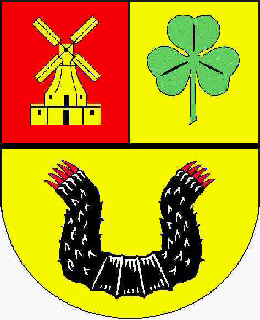
- Coat of arms

- Location of Maasen within Diepholz district
- Interactive map of Maasen
- Location within Germany Location within Lower Saxony
- Coordinates: 52°42′N 08°53′E
- Country: Germany
- State: Lower Saxony
- District: Diepholz
- Municipal assoc.: Siedenburg
- Subdivisions: 4 Ortsteile

Government
  - Mayor: Stefan Tannhäuser

Area
  - Total: 18.72 km^{2} (7.23 sq mi)
- Elevation: 45 m (148 ft)

Population (2025-12-31)
  - Total: 435
  - Density: 23.2/km^{2} (60.2/sq mi)
- Time zone: UTC+01:00 (CET)
  - Summer (DST): UTC+02:00 (CEST)
- Postal codes: 27249
- Dialling codes: 04272
- Vehicle registration: DH

Maasen (German pronunciation: [ˈmaːzn̩]) is a municipality in the district of Diepholz, in Lower Saxony, Germany.
