= Kirchdorf (Samtgemeinde) =

- Samtgemeinde
- Location of Kirchdorf within Diepholz district
- Interactive map of Kirchdorf
- Location within Germany Location within Lower Saxony
- Coordinates: 52°36′N 8°50′E
- Country: Germany
- State: Lower Saxony
- District: Diepholz
- Seat: Kirchdorf
- Subdivisions: 6 municipalities

Area
  - Total: 180.09 km^{2} (69.53 sq mi)

Population (2025-12-31)
  - Total: 7,167
  - Density: 39.80/km^{2} (103.1/sq mi)
- Time zone: UTC+01:00 (CET)
  - Summer (DST): UTC+02:00 (CEST)
- Website: www.kirchdorf.de

Kirchdorf is a Samtgemeinde ("collective municipality") in the district of Diepholz, in Lower Saxony, Germany. Its seat is in Kirchdorf.

The Samtgemeinde Kirchdorf consists of the following municipalities:

1. Bahrenborstel
2. Barenburg
3. Freistatt
4. Kirchdorf
5. Varrel
6. Wehrbleck
