= Schwaförden (Samtgemeinde) =

- Samtgemeinde
- Location of Schwaförden within Diepholz district
- Interactive map of Schwaförden
- Location within Germany Location within Lower Saxony
- Coordinates: 52°44′N 8°50′E
- Country: Germany
- State: Lower Saxony
- District: Diepholz
- Seat: Schwaförden
- Subdivisions: 6 municipalities

Area
  - Total: 149.81 km^{2} (57.84 sq mi)

Population (2025-12-31)
  - Total: 6,739
  - Density: 44.98/km^{2} (116.5/sq mi)
- Time zone: UTC+01:00 (CET)
  - Summer (DST): UTC+02:00 (CEST)
- Website: www.schwafoerden.de

Schwaförden is a Samtgemeinde ("collective municipality") in the district of Diepholz, in Lower Saxony, Germany. Its seat is in Schwaförden.

The Samtgemeinde Schwaförden consists of the following municipalities:

1. Affinghausen
2. Ehrenburg
3. Neuenkirchen
4. Scholen
5. Schwaförden
6. Sudwalde
