= Marl, Lower Saxony =

Municipality in the district of Diepholz

Marl
- Municipality
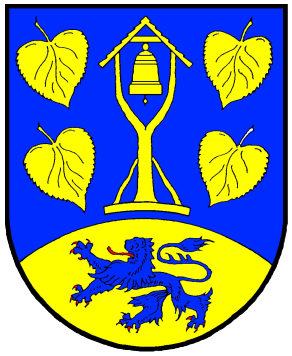
- Coat of arms

- Location of Marl within Diepholz district
- Interactive map of Marl
- Location within Germany Location within Lower Saxony
- Coordinates: 52°28′59″N 08°22′00″E
- Country: Germany
- State: Lower Saxony
- District: Diepholz
- Municipal assoc.: Altes Amt Lemförde

Government
  - Mayor: Hartmut Henke

Area
  - Total: 9.84 km^{2} (3.80 sq mi)
- Elevation: 39 m (128 ft)

Population (2025-12-31)
  - Total: 723
  - Density: 73.5/km^{2} (190/sq mi)
- Time zone: UTC+01:00 (CET)
  - Summer (DST): UTC+02:00 (CEST)
- Postal codes: 49448
- Dialling codes: 05443
- Vehicle registration: DH

Marl (German pronunciation: [maʁl]) is a municipality in the district of Diepholz, in Lower Saxony, Germany.
