= Altes Amt Lemförde =

- Samtgemeinde
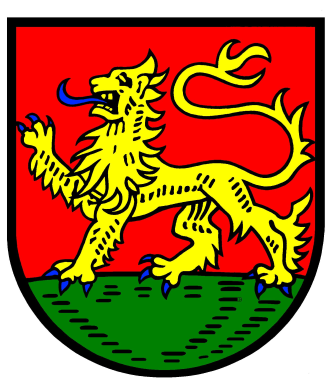
- Coat of arms

- Location of Altes Amt Lemförde within Diepholz district
- Interactive map of Altes Amt Lemförde
- Location within Germany Location within Lower Saxony
- Coordinates: 52°27′52″N 08°22′29″E
- Country: Germany
- State: Lower Saxony
- District: Diepholz
- Seat: Lemförde
- Subdivisions: 7 municipalities

Government
  - Mayor (2021–26): Lars Mentrup

Area
  - Total: 109.62 km^{2} (42.32 sq mi)
- Elevation: 41 m (135 ft)

Population (2025-12-31)
  - Total: 8,987
  - Density: 81.98/km^{2} (212.3/sq mi)
- Time zone: UTC+01:00 (CET)
  - Summer (DST): UTC+02:00 (CEST)
- Postal codes: 49448
- Dialling codes: 05443
- Vehicle registration: DH
- Website: www.lemfoerde.de

Altes Amt Lemförde is a Samtgemeinde ("collective municipality") in the district of Diepholz, in Lower Saxony, Germany. Its seat is in the village Lemförde.

The Samtgemeinde Altes Amt Lemförde consists of the following municipalities:

- Brockum
- Hüde
- Lembruch
- Lemförde
- Marl
- Quernheim
- Stemshorn
