= Lembruch =

- Municipality
- Location of Lembruch within Diepholz district
- Interactive map of Lembruch
- Location within Germany Location within Lower Saxony
- Coordinates: 52°32′N 08°21′E
- Country: Germany
- State: Lower Saxony
- District: Diepholz
- Municipal assoc.: Altes Amt Lemförde

Government
  - Mayor: Margerete Schlick

Area
  - Total: 22.68 km^{2} (8.76 sq mi)
- Elevation: 36 m (118 ft)

Population (2025-12-31)
  - Total: 1,275
  - Density: 56.22/km^{2} (145.6/sq mi)
- Time zone: UTC+01:00 (CET)
  - Summer (DST): UTC+02:00 (CEST)
- Postal codes: 49459
- Dialling codes: 05447
- Vehicle registration: DH

Lembruch is a municipality in the district of Diepholz, in Lower Saxony, Germany. A touristic locality during the summer season, it borders the Dümmer, a lake known in the region for birdwatching and watersports such as wind-surfing.
