= Sudwalde =

- Municipality
- Coat of arms

- Location of Sudwalde within Diepholz district
- Interactive map of Sudwalde
- Location within Germany Location within Lower Saxony
- Coordinates: 52°48′N 08°51′E
- Country: Germany
- State: Lower Saxony
- District: Diepholz
- Municipal assoc.: Schwaförden

Government
  - Mayor: Rainer Klusmann

Area
  - Total: 27.15 km^{2} (10.48 sq mi)
- Elevation: 49 m (161 ft)

Population (2025-12-31)
  - Total: 986
  - Density: 36.3/km^{2} (94.1/sq mi)
- Time zone: UTC+01:00 (CET)
  - Summer (DST): UTC+02:00 (CEST)
- Postal codes: 27257
- Dialling codes: 04247
- Vehicle registration: DH

Sudwalde is a municipality in the district of Diepholz, in Lower Saxony, Germany.
