= Asendorf =

- Municipality
- Coat of arms

- Location of Asendorf within Diepholz district
- Interactive map of Asendorf
- Location within Germany Location within Lower Saxony
- Coordinates: 52°46′21″N 09°00′27″E
- Country: Germany
- State: Lower Saxony
- District: Diepholz
- Municipal assoc.: Bruchhausen-Vilsen

Government
  - Mayor: Wolfgang Heere

Area
  - Total: 58.24 km^{2} (22.49 sq mi)
- Elevation: 49 m (161 ft)

Population (2025-12-31)
  - Total: 2,807
  - Density: 48.20/km^{2} (124.8/sq mi)
- Time zone: UTC+01:00 (CET)
  - Summer (DST): UTC+02:00 (CEST)
- Postal codes: 27330
- Dialling codes: 04253
- Vehicle registration: DH
- Website: www.asendorf.info

Asendorf (German pronunciation: [ˈaːzn̩dɔʁf]) is a municipality in the district of Diepholz, in Lower Saxony, Germany.

Asendorf is also very famous for Germany's first Museumseisenbahn. The track of this train is between Asendorf and Bruchhausen-Vilsen.
