= Mellinghausen =

- Municipality
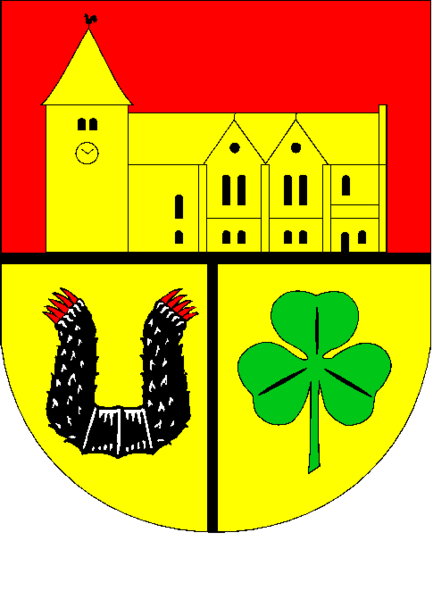
- Coat of arms

- Location of Mellinghausen within Diepholz district
- Interactive map of Mellinghausen
- Location within Germany Location within Lower Saxony
- Coordinates: 52°42′N 8°54′E
- Country: Germany
- State: Lower Saxony
- District: Diepholz
- Municipal assoc.: Siedenburg
- Subdivisions: 3 Ortsteile

Government
  - Mayor: Heiner v.d. Behrens (SPD)

Area
  - Total: 24.44 km^{2} (9.44 sq mi)
- Elevation: 44 m (144 ft)

Population (2025-12-31)
  - Total: 1,043
  - Density: 42.68/km^{2} (110.5/sq mi)
- Time zone: UTC+01:00 (CET)
  - Summer (DST): UTC+02:00 (CEST)
- Postal codes: 27249
- Dialling codes: 04272
- Vehicle registration: DH
- Website: www.siedenburg-online.de

Mellinghausen (German pronunciation: [mɛlɪŋˈhaʊzn̩]) is a municipality in the district of Diepholz, in Lower Saxony, Germany.
