= Stemshorn =

- Municipality
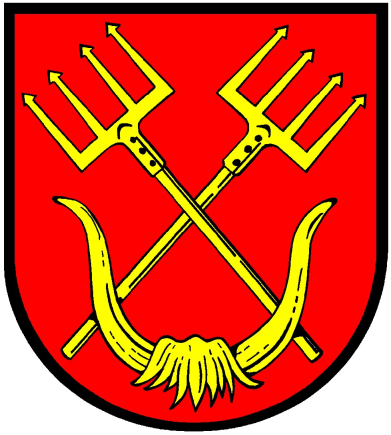
- Coat of arms

- Location of Stemshorn within Diepholz district
- Interactive map of Stemshorn
- Location within Germany Location within Lower Saxony
- Coordinates: 52°27′N 08°22′E
- Country: Germany
- State: Lower Saxony
- District: Diepholz
- Municipal assoc.: Altes Amt Lemförde

Government
  - Mayor: Heiner Lindemann

Area
  - Total: 8.84 km^{2} (3.41 sq mi)
- Elevation: 91 m (299 ft)

Population (2025-12-31)
  - Total: 725
  - Density: 82.0/km^{2} (212/sq mi)
- Time zone: UTC+01:00 (CET)
  - Summer (DST): UTC+02:00 (CEST)
- Postal codes: 49448
- Dialling codes: 05443
- Vehicle registration: DH

Stemshorn is a municipality in the district of Diepholz, in Lower Saxony, Germany.
