= Schwaförden =

- Municipality
- Coat of arms

- Location of Schwaförden within Diepholz district
- Interactive map of Schwaförden
- Location within Germany Location within Lower Saxony
- Coordinates: 52°44′N 08°50′E
- Country: Germany
- State: Lower Saxony
- District: Diepholz
- Municipal assoc.: Schwaförden

Government
  - Mayor: Wilfried Schlichte (CDU)

Area
  - Total: 25.96 km^{2} (10.02 sq mi)
- Elevation: 55 m (180 ft)

Population (2025-12-31)
  - Total: 1,456
  - Density: 56.09/km^{2} (145.3/sq mi)
- Time zone: UTC+01:00 (CET)
  - Summer (DST): UTC+02:00 (CEST)
- Postal codes: 27252
- Dialling codes: 04277
- Vehicle registration: DH
- Website: www.schwafoerden.de

Schwaförden is a municipality in the district of Diepholz, in Lower Saxony, Germany. It is situated approximately 40 km south of Bremen.

Schwaförden is also the seat of the Samtgemeinde ("collective municipality") Schwaförden.
