= Scholen =

- Municipality
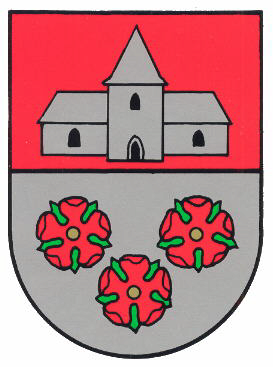
- Coat of arms

- Location of Scholen within Diepholz district
- Interactive map of Scholen
- Location within Germany Location within Lower Saxony
- Coordinates: 52°44′N 08°46′E
- Country: Germany
- State: Lower Saxony
- District: Diepholz
- Municipal assoc.: Schwaförden

Government
  - Mayor: Karl-Heinz Schwenn

Area
  - Total: 20.47 km^{2} (7.90 sq mi)
- Elevation: 52 m (171 ft)

Population (2025-12-31)
  - Total: 772
  - Density: 37.7/km^{2} (97.7/sq mi)
- Time zone: UTC+01:00 (CET)
  - Summer (DST): UTC+02:00 (CEST)
- Postal codes: 27251
- Dialling codes: 04245
- Vehicle registration: DH

Scholen (German pronunciation: [ˈʃoːlən]) is a municipality in the district of Diepholz, in Lower Saxony, Germany.
