= Ehrenburg, Lower Saxony =

Ehrenburg
- Municipality
- Coat of arms

- Location of Ehrenburg within Diepholz district
- Interactive map of Ehrenburg
- Location within Germany Location within Lower Saxony
- Coordinates: 52°45′N 08°42′E
- Country: Germany
- State: Lower Saxony
- District: Diepholz
- Municipal assoc.: Schwaförden

Government
  - Mayor: Hans-Jürgen Schumacher

Area
  - Total: 49.17 km^{2} (18.98 sq mi)
- Elevation: 49 m (161 ft)

Population (2025-12-31)
  - Total: 1,498
  - Density: 30.47/km^{2} (78.91/sq mi)
- Time zone: UTC+01:00 (CET)
  - Summer (DST): UTC+02:00 (CEST)
- Postal codes: 27248
- Dialling codes: 04275
- Vehicle registration: DH

Ehrenburg (German pronunciation: [ˈeːʁənbʊʁk]; Low German: Ehrenborg) is a municipality in the district of Diepholz, in Lower Saxony, Germany.
