= Quernheim =

- Municipality
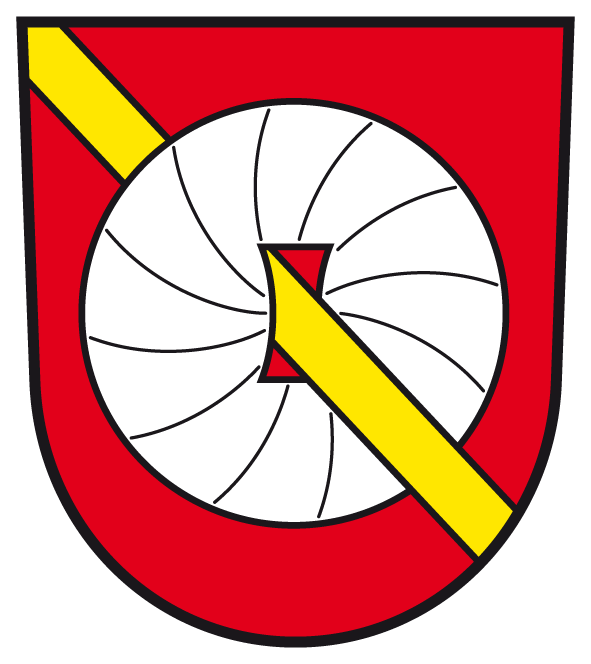
- Coat of arms

- Location of Quernheim within Diepholz district
- Interactive map of Quernheim
- Location within Germany Location within Lower Saxony
- Coordinates: 52°28′N 08°24′E
- Country: Germany
- State: Lower Saxony
- District: Diepholz
- Municipal assoc.: Altes Amt Lemförde

Government
  - Mayor: Diethelm Schmidt

Area
  - Total: 6.24 km^{2} (2.41 sq mi)
- Elevation: 52 m (171 ft)

Population (2025-12-31)
  - Total: 503
  - Density: 80.6/km^{2} (209/sq mi)
- Time zone: UTC+01:00 (CET)
  - Summer (DST): UTC+02:00 (CEST)
- Postal codes: 49448
- Dialling codes: 05443
- Vehicle registration: DH

Quernheim (German pronunciation: [ˈkvɛʁnhaɪm]) is a municipality in the district of Diepholz, in Lower Saxony, Germany. It is part of the Altes Amt Lemförde and has a population of about 480 inhabitants.

It is known for being the smallest municipality in Germany with a fully functioning public cinema; the "Lichtburg" is regarded as a local institution with its 1950s-style interior design (however it uses modern technology to screen films on current release).
