= Neuenkirchen, Diepholz =

Neuenkirchen
- Municipality
- Coat of arms

- Location of Neuenkirchen within Diepholz district
- Interactive map of Neuenkirchen
- Location within Germany Location within Lower Saxony
- Coordinates: 52°46′N 08°44′E
- Country: Germany
- State: Lower Saxony
- District: Diepholz
- Municipal assoc.: Schwaförden

Government
  - Mayor: Hermann Meyer

Area
  - Total: 14.67 km^{2} (5.66 sq mi)
- Elevation: 60 m (200 ft)

Population (2025-12-31)
  - Total: 1,225
  - Density: 83.50/km^{2} (216.3/sq mi)
- Time zone: UTC+01:00 (CET)
  - Summer (DST): UTC+02:00 (CEST)
- Postal codes: 27251
- Dialling codes: 04245
- Vehicle registration: DH

Neuenkirchen (German pronunciation: [ˈnɔʏənˌkɪʁçn̩]) is a municipality in the district of Diepholz, in Lower Saxony, Germany.
