= Affinghausen =

- Municipality
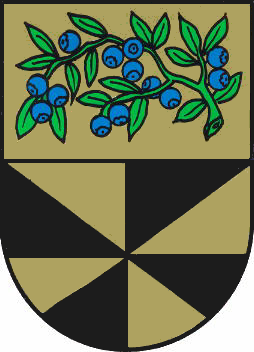
- Coat of arms

- Location of Affinghausen within Diepholz district
- Interactive map of Affinghausen
- Location within Germany Location within Lower Saxony
- Coordinates: 52°47′03″N 08°52′53″E
- Country: Germany
- State: Lower Saxony
- District: Diepholz
- Municipal assoc.: Schwaförden
- Subdivisions: 4 Ortsteile

Government
  - Mayor: Jürgen Köberlein

Area
  - Total: 12.26 km^{2} (4.73 sq mi)
- Elevation: 51 m (167 ft)

Population (2025-12-31)
  - Total: 802
  - Density: 65.4/km^{2} (169/sq mi)
- Time zone: UTC+01:00 (CET)
  - Summer (DST): UTC+02:00 (CEST)
- Postal codes: 27257
- Dialling codes: 04247
- Vehicle registration: DH
- Website: www.schwafoerden.de

Affinghausen (German pronunciation: [afɪŋˈhaʊzn̩]) is a municipality in the district of Diepholz, in Lower Saxony, Germany.
