= Varrel =

- Municipality
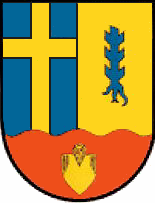
- Coat of arms

- Location of Varrel within Diepholz district
- Interactive map of Varrel
- Location within Germany Location within Lower Saxony
- Coordinates: 52°37′N 08°44′E
- Country: Germany
- State: Lower Saxony
- District: Diepholz
- Municipal assoc.: Kirchdorf
- Subdivisions: 3

Government
  - Mayor: Ortwin Stieglitz

Area
  - Total: 43.99 km^{2} (16.98 sq mi)
- Elevation: 34 m (112 ft)

Population (2025-12-31)
  - Total: 1,334
  - Density: 30.33/km^{2} (78.54/sq mi)
- Time zone: UTC+01:00 (CET)
  - Summer (DST): UTC+02:00 (CEST)
- Postal codes: 27259
- Dialling codes: 04274
- Vehicle registration: DH
- Website: www.varrel.de

Varrel (German pronunciation: [ˈfaʁəl]) is a municipality in the district of Diepholz, in Lower Saxony, Germany.
