= Brockum =

- Municipality
- Location of Brockum within Diepholz district
- Interactive map of Brockum
- Location within Germany Location within Lower Saxony
- Coordinates: 52°28′03″N 08°24′59″E
- Country: Germany
- State: Lower Saxony
- District: Diepholz
- Municipal assoc.: Altes Amt Lemförde

Government
  - Mayor: Daniel Kütenbrink (Independent voters association)

Area
  - Total: 30.62 km^{2} (11.82 sq mi)
- Elevation: 52 m (171 ft)

Population (2025-12-31)
  - Total: 1,070
  - Density: 34.9/km^{2} (90.5/sq mi)
- Time zone: UTC+01:00 (CET)
  - Summer (DST): UTC+02:00 (CEST)
- Postal codes: 49448
- Dialling codes: 05443
- Vehicle registration: DH
- Website: https://www.brockum.de/

Brockum (German pronunciation: [ˈbʁoːkʊm]; Low German: Brookm) is a municipality in the district of Diepholz in Lower Saxony, Germany. It belongs to the Samtgemeinde Altes Amt Lemförde, with administrative headquarters in Lemförde.

== Geography ==
=== Geographical location ===
Brockum lies within the Naturpark Dümmer, a protected landscape characterized by extensive moorlands, lowlands, Lake Dümmer and the Stemweder Berg hills.

About 2.3 km north of the village is the Sette nature reserve, covering roughly 44 hectares and designated in 1988 as part of the Diepholz moorland lowlands.

The municipality is located approximately 3 km east of Lemförde and north of the Stemweder Berg. Lake Dümmer, the central body of water in the nature park and a regional recreation area for sailing and surfing, lies around 7 km northwest of the village centre.

Brockum covers an area of about 30.6 km² and is the largest member municipality of the Samtgemeinde Altes Amt Lemförde.

=== Population development ===
According to official statistics, Brockum had 1,072 inhabitants as of 1 June 2025 (524 male and 548 female), resulting in a population density of approximately 35 inhabitants per km². At the end of 2024, the population stood at 1,086.

== History ==
Brockum was first documented in 969 under the name Bruochem, in a donation charter by Bishop Milo of Minden. Later historical forms include Brochem (1243) and Bruchem (1247). The place name refers to a “settlement near marshland”.

In early modern times Brockum gained regional importance through its annual market, two windmills and a customs station. A chapel dedicated to Mary, Simon and Jude existed, with a cemetery described as “very old” around 1460.

A separate parish was established in 1661, formerly belonging to Dielingen. The present church building dates from 1833; a west tower added in 1894 has been preserved after the church was demolished in 1971.

In 1822, a major fire destroyed most of the village. During the 20th and 21st centuries Brockum developed from a predominantly agricultural settlement into a residential municipality.

The Brockum market originated as a church fair and has been documented since 1558 as a free market and from 1573 as a fair (kermisse).

== Politics ==
=== Municipal council ===
The municipal council consists of eleven members and has been represented exclusively by a local voters’ association for several electoral periods.

=== Mayor ===
Daniel Kütenbrink has served as honorary mayor since 2025.

== Culture and sights ==
=== Brockumer Großmarkt ===
The Brockumer Großmarkt, held annually on the last weekend in October, is the municipality’s most important event. It developed from a church fair into a regional trade and livestock market and today combines amusement fair, commercial exhibition and agricultural displays, attracting around 200,000 visitors each year.

=== Buildings and memorials ===
Listed monuments include the preserved tower of the former Brockum church. Other notable sites are the historic bakehouse and the “1000-Year Stone”, commemorating the first documented mention of Brockum.

=== Associations ===
Community life is shaped by numerous local clubs, including TSV Brockum (founded 1921), a shooting club, volunteer fire brigade, choir associations and a heritage society.

== Economy and infrastructure ==
Brockum is connected to the regional road network via Bundesstraße 51 (Diepholz–Osnabrück). The economy is largely rural, with agriculture and small businesses. Larger employment centres are located mainly in Lemförde and throughout the Diepholz district.

Public facilities include a primary school, sports grounds, shooting hall and volunteer fire brigade.

== Education ==
Primary education is provided locally; secondary schools are located in Lemförde, Diepholz and surrounding towns.
