= Martfeld =

- Municipality
- Location of Martfeld within Diepholz district
- Interactive map of Martfeld
- Location within Germany Location within Lower Saxony
- Coordinates: 52°52′N 09°04′E
- Country: Germany
- State: Lower Saxony
- District: Diepholz
- Municipal assoc.: Bruchhausen-Vilsen

Government
  - Mayor: Marlies Plate (Greens)

Area
  - Total: 35.06 km^{2} (13.54 sq mi)
- Elevation: 12 m (39 ft)

Population (2025-12-31)
  - Total: 2,914
  - Density: 83.11/km^{2} (215.3/sq mi)
- Time zone: UTC+01:00 (CET)
  - Summer (DST): UTC+02:00 (CEST)
- Postal codes: 27327
- Dialling codes: 04255
- Vehicle registration: DH
- Website: www.martfeld.de

Martfeld (German pronunciation: [ˈmaʁtfɛlt]) is a municipality in the district of Diepholz, in Lower Saxony, Germany. It is part of the Bruchhausen-Vilsen (Samtgemeinde) Collective Municipality.

== Geography ==
=== Geographic Location ===
Martfeld is located approximately 36 km southeast of Bremen.

=== Neighbors ===
Neighboring communities are Schwarme and Bruchhausen-Vilsen

=== Community Breakdown ===
The following places belong administratively to Martfeld:

- Hollen
- Hustedt
- Kleinenborstel
- Loge
- Martfelder Heide
- Tuschendorf

== History ==
The village was first mentioned in a papal document personally signed by Pope Alexander III in 1179.

== Politics ==
=== Municipal Council ===
- SPD - 3 Seats
- Green - 2 Seats
- Others - 8 Seats

=== Partner Towns ===
- La Bazoge in France

== Culture and the Arts ==
=== Structures ===
- Martfeld Mill: The Martfeld mill was first mentioned in the year 1583. Originally built as a block windmill, in 1840 it was rebuilt in three story Dutch style. The mill burned to the ground after a lightning strike in 1851 and was rebuilt the same year. Between 1992 and 1999 the mill was completely renovated. The mill is the oldest windmill in the area.
- Fehsenfeldsche Mill: Built in 1871 in the three-story Dutch style, the mill operated until 1971. In 1991 the mill was restored and is now used for weddings.

=== Public art ===
- On the village square can be found the stainless steel sculpture titled, “Entfaltund” (Development) by the Syke artists Elsa Töbelmann and Henning Greve. The sculpture was created in 1999 as part of the competition, “Our Village Beautiful.”
