= Wehrbleck =

- Municipality
- Coat of arms

- Location of Wehrbleck within Diepholz district
- Interactive map of Wehrbleck
- Location within Germany Location within Lower Saxony
- Coordinates: 52°38′N 8°42′E
- Country: Germany
- State: Lower Saxony
- District: Diepholz
- Municipal assoc.: Kirchdorf

Government
  - Mayor: Heinrich Schwenker

Area
  - Total: 28.03 km^{2} (10.82 sq mi)
- Elevation: 39 m (128 ft)

Population (2025-12-31)
  - Total: 787
  - Density: 28.1/km^{2} (72.7/sq mi)
- Time zone: UTC+01:00 (CET)
  - Summer (DST): UTC+02:00 (CEST)
- Postal codes: 27259
- Dialling codes: 04274
- Vehicle registration: DH
- Website: www.wehrbleck.de

Wehrbleck (German pronunciation: [ˈveːɐ̯blɛk]) is a municipality in the district of Diepholz, in Lower Saxony, Germany.
