= Staffhorst =

- Municipality
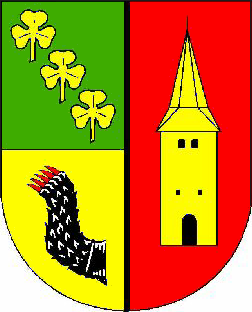
- Coat of arms

- Location of Staffhorst within Diepholz district
- Interactive map of Staffhorst
- Location within Germany Location within Lower Saxony
- Coordinates: 52°43′N 08°58′E
- Country: Germany
- State: Lower Saxony
- District: Diepholz
- Municipal assoc.: Siedenburg
- Subdivisions: 2

Government
  - Mayor: Werner Holle

Area
  - Total: 14.65 km^{2} (5.66 sq mi)
- Elevation: 44 m (144 ft)

Population (2025-12-31)
  - Total: 516
  - Density: 35.2/km^{2} (91.2/sq mi)
- Time zone: UTC+01:00 (CET)
  - Summer (DST): UTC+02:00 (CEST)
- Postal codes: 27254
- Dialling codes: 04272
- Vehicle registration: DH

Staffhorst (German pronunciation: [ˈʃtafhɔʁst]) is a municipality in the district of Diepholz, in Lower Saxony, Germany.
