= Hüde =

- Municipality
- Location of Hüde within Diepholz district
- Interactive map of Hüde
- Location within Germany Location within Lower Saxony
- Coordinates: 52°29′N 08°21′E
- Country: Germany
- State: Lower Saxony
- District: Diepholz
- Municipal assoc.: Altes Amt Lemförde

Government
  - Mayor: Heiner Richmann

Area
  - Total: 24.41 km^{2} (9.42 sq mi)
- Elevation: 39 m (128 ft)

Population (2025-12-31)
  - Total: 1,237
  - Density: 50.68/km^{2} (131.3/sq mi)
- Time zone: UTC+01:00 (CET)
  - Summer (DST): UTC+02:00 (CEST)
- Postal codes: 49448
- Dialling codes: 05443, 05447
- Vehicle registration: DH

Hüde (German pronunciation: [ˈhyːdə]) is a municipality in the district of Diepholz, in Lower Saxony, Germany.
