= Rehden (Samtgemeinde) =

- Samtgemeinde
- Location of Rehden within Diepholz district
- Interactive map of Rehden
- Location within Germany Location within Lower Saxony
- Coordinates: 52°36′N 8°30′E
- Country: Germany
- State: Lower Saxony
- District: Diepholz
- Seat: Rehden
- Subdivisions: 5 municipalities

Area
  - Total: 128.3 km^{2} (49.5 sq mi)

Population (2025-12-31)
  - Total: 6,105
  - Density: 47.58/km^{2} (123.2/sq mi)
- Time zone: UTC+01:00 (CET)
  - Summer (DST): UTC+02:00 (CEST)
- Website: www.rehden.de

Rehden is a Samtgemeinde ("collective municipality") in the district of Diepholz, in Lower Saxony, Germany. Its seat is in Rehden.

The Samtgemeinde Rehden consists of the following municipalities:

1. Barver
2. Dickel
3. Hemsloh
4. Rehden
5. Wetschen
