= Bruchhausen-Vilsen (Samtgemeinde) =

- Samtgemeinde
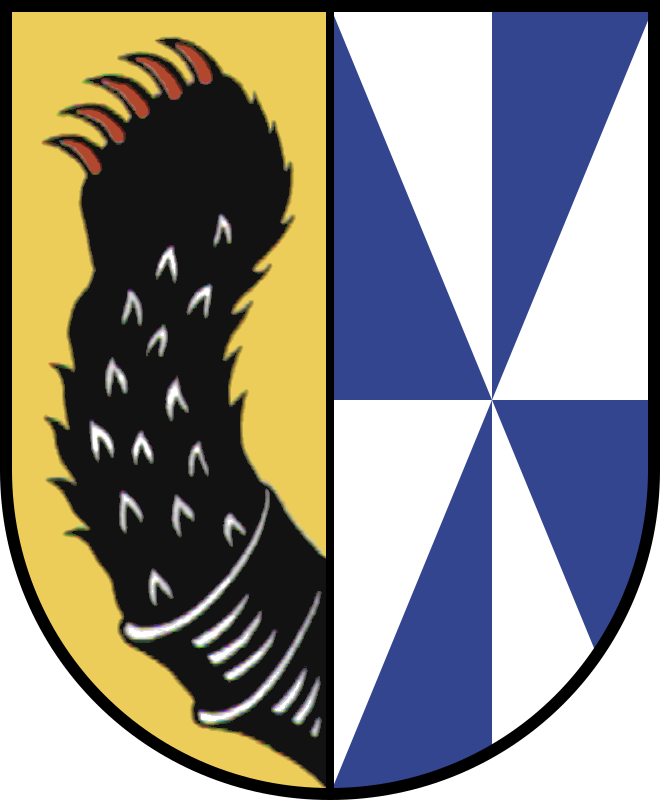
- Coat of arms

- Location of Bruchhausen-Vilsen within Diepholz district
- Interactive map of Bruchhausen-Vilsen
- Location within Germany Location within Lower Saxony
- Coordinates: 52°50′N 8°59′E
- Country: Germany
- State: Lower Saxony
- District: Diepholz
- Seat: Bruchhausen-Vilsen
- Subdivisions: 4 municipalities

Area
  - Total: 227.34 km^{2} (87.78 sq mi)

Population (2025-12-31)
  - Total: 17,341
  - Density: 76.278/km^{2} (197.56/sq mi)
- Time zone: UTC+01:00 (CET)
  - Summer (DST): UTC+02:00 (CEST)
- Website: www.bruchhausen-vilsen.de

Bruchhausen-Vilsen is a Samtgemeinde ("collective municipality") in the district of Diepholz, in Lower Saxony, Germany. Its seat is in Bruchhausen-Vilsen.

The Samtgemeinde Bruchhausen-Vilsen consists of the following municipalities:

1. Asendorf
2. Bruchhausen-Vilsen
3. Martfeld
4. Schwarme
