= Rehden Geest Moor =

- Naturschutzgebiet Rehdener Geestmoor
- IUCN category IV (habitat/species management area)
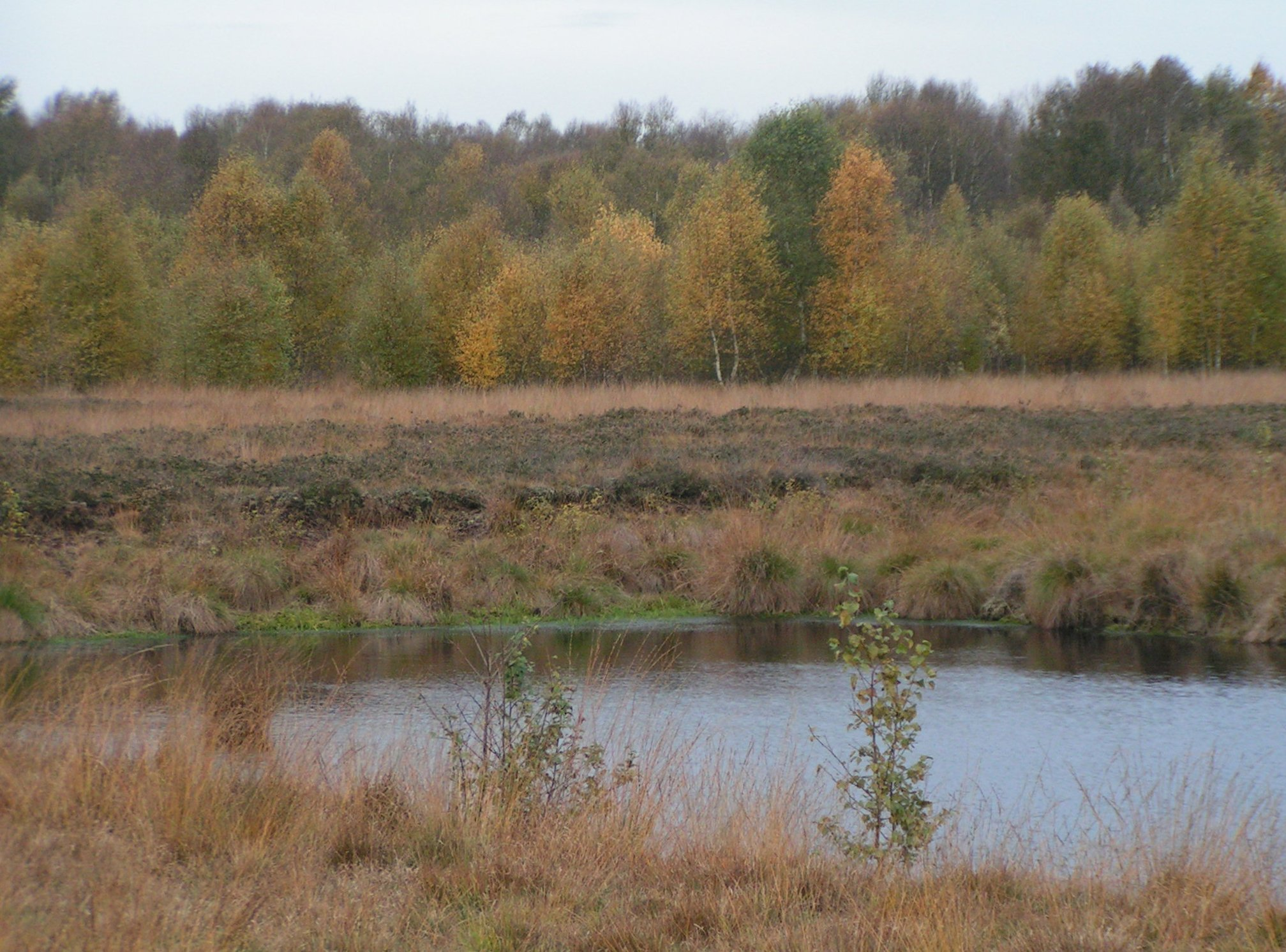
- The geest bog; view from the embankment
- Interactive map of Rehden Geest Moor
- Location: south of Rehden in the Lower Saxon county of Diepholz
- Coordinates: 52°34′20″N 8°30′10″E
- Area: 1,145.8–1,195.0 hectares (2,831–2,953 acres)
- Elevation: 38 m (125 ft)
- Designation: 30109
- Established: 1982-05-13
- Administrator: NLWKN
- Website: NSG HA 062

The nature reserve of Rehden Geest Moor (German: Rehdener Geestmoor) is an extensive, open raised bog in the collective municipality of Rehden, in the county of Diepholz in Lower Saxony. It is a representative raised bog for the natural region known as the Diepholz Moor Depression (Diepholzer Moorniederung). According to GIS it covers an area of 1,736 hectares, but according to the conservation act, 1,786 hectares.
