= Lemförde =

- Municipality
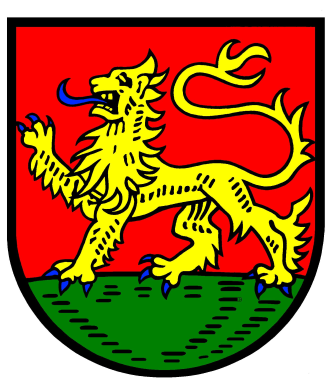
- Coat of arms

- Location of Lemförde within Diepholz district
- Interactive map of Lemförde
- Location within Germany Location within Lower Saxony
- Coordinates: 52°28′N 08°23′E
- Country: Germany
- State: Lower Saxony
- District: Diepholz
- Municipal assoc.: Altes Amt Lemförde

Government
  - Mayor: Stefanie Budke-Stambusch

Area
  - Total: 6.95 km^{2} (2.68 sq mi)
- Elevation: 46 m (151 ft)

Population (2025-12-31)
  - Total: 3,454
  - Density: 497/km^{2} (1,290/sq mi)
- Time zone: UTC+01:00 (CET)
  - Summer (DST): UTC+02:00 (CEST)
- Postal codes: 49448
- Dialling codes: 05443
- Vehicle registration: DH
- Website: www.lemfoerde.de

Lemförde is a municipality in the district of Diepholz, in Lower Saxony, Germany. It is situated near lake Dümmer, approx. 15 km south of Diepholz.

Lemförde is also the seat of the Samtgemeinde ("collective municipality") Altes Amt Lemförde.
