= Siedenburg (Samtgemeinde) =

Collective municipality in Lower Saxony

- Samtgemeinde
- Location of Siedenburg within Diepholz district
- Interactive map of Siedenburg
- Location within Germany Location within Lower Saxony
- Coordinates: 52°42′N 8°56′E
- Country: Germany
- State: Lower Saxony
- District: Diepholz
- Seat: Siedenburg
- Subdivisions: 5 municipalities

Area
  - Total: 103.12 km^{2} (39.81 sq mi)

Population (2025-12-31)
  - Total: 4,374
  - Density: 42.42/km^{2} (109.9/sq mi)
- Time zone: UTC+01:00 (CET)
  - Summer (DST): UTC+02:00 (CEST)
- Website: www.siedenburg-online.de

Siedenburg is a Samtgemeinde ("collective municipality") in the east of the district of Diepholz, in Lower Saxony, Germany. Its seat is in Siedenburg. It was formed in 1974 during a municipal reorganisation of Lower Saxony.

The Samtgemeinde Siedenburg consists of the following municipalities:

1. Borstel
2. Maasen
3. Mellinghausen
4. Siedenburg
5. Staffhorst
