= Siedenburg =

- Municipality
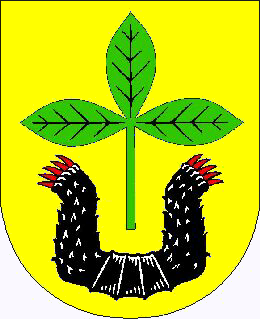
- Coat of arms

- Location of Siedenburg within Diepholz district
- Interactive map of Siedenburg
- Location within Germany Location within Lower Saxony
- Coordinates: 52°42′N 08°56′E
- Country: Germany
- State: Lower Saxony
- District: Diepholz
- Municipal assoc.: Siedenburg

Government
  - Mayor: Arnold Runge

Area
  - Total: 14.23 km^{2} (5.49 sq mi)
- Elevation: 39 m (128 ft)

Population (2025-12-31)
  - Total: 1,218
  - Density: 85.59/km^{2} (221.7/sq mi)
- Time zone: UTC+01:00 (CET)
  - Summer (DST): UTC+02:00 (CEST)
- Postal codes: 27254
- Dialling codes: 04272
- Vehicle registration: DH
- Website: www.siedenburg-online.de

Siedenburg (German pronunciation: [ˈziːdn̩bʊʁk]) is a municipality in the district of Diepholz, in Lower Saxony, Germany. It is situated approximately 20 km west of Nienburg.

Siedenburg is also the seat of the Samtgemeinde ("collective municipality") Siedenburg.
