= Diepholz (district) =

District in Lower Saxony, Germany

Coordinates: 52°40′N 8°35′E

- District
- Flag Coat of arms
- Country: Germany
- State: Lower Saxony
- Capital: Diepholz

Government
  - District admin.: Cord Bockhop (CDU)

Area
  - Total: 1,987 km^{2} (767 sq mi)

Population (31 December 2024)
  - Total: 221,202
  - Density: 111.3/km^{2} (288.3/sq mi)
- Time zone: UTC+01:00 (CET)
  - Summer (DST): UTC+02:00 (CEST)
- Vehicle registration: DH, SY
- Website: diepholz.de

Diepholz (German pronunciation: [ˈdiːphɔlts]) is a district in Lower Saxony, Germany. It is bounded by (clockwise from the northeast) the districts of Verden, Nienburg, Minden-Lübbecke (in North Rhine-Westphalia), Osnabrück, Vechta and Oldenburg, and by the cities of Delmenhorst and Bremen. The most populous municipality is Stuhr on the border with Bremen.

== History ==
From the 12th century to 1585 Diepholz was a sovereign Noble Lordship, later County, within the Holy Roman Empire that was ruled over by the Noble Lords, later Counts, of Diepholz. At the beginning of the 16th century there was great pressure from the powerful duchy of Brunswick-Lüneburg, which tried to annex the smaller states. By forming an alliance with the neighbouring County of Hoya and asking for help from the emperor himself the state of Diepholz managed to survive some more decades. In 1585 the ruling family became extinct, and Diepholz was eventually annexed by Brunswick-Lüneburg.

In 1932, the district of Grafschaft Diepholz (County of Diepholz) was established by merging the former districts of Diepholz and Sulingen. The former district of Diepholz was roughly identical to the medieval state, while the Sulingen district had been a part of the County of Hoya.

The present district of Diepholz was formed in 1977 by merging the former district of Grafschaft Diepholz (County of Diepholz) with parts of the former district of Grafschaft Hoya (County of Hoya), while the town Hoya itself became part of the district Nienburg.

== Geography ==
The district extends from the southern outskirts of Bremen to the border of North Rhine-Westphalia. In the south there is the Dümmer, a lake with an area of 16 km^{2}, which is surrounded by fens. Many rare bird species breed in the reeds around the lake. The northern portions of the district are occupied by forests and agricultural lands.

== Coat of arms ==
The lion is taken from the original arms of the Count of Diepholz. The bear claws are from the arms of Count of Hoya. This combination symbolizes the merger of County of Diepholz and County of Hoya in 1977.

== Cities and municipalities ==
Clickable map of towns and municipalities in the district

Towns	Samtgemeinden
1. Bassum; 2. Diepholz; 3. Sulingen; 4. Syke; 5. Twistringen; Free municipalities: 1. Stuhr; 2. Wagenfeld; 3. Weyhe	1. Altes Amt Lemförde; 1. Brockum; 2. Hüde; 3. Lembruch; 4. Lemförde^{1}; 5. Marl; 6. Quernheim; 7. Stemshorn; 2. Barnstorf; 1. Barnstorf^{1}; 2. Drebber; 3. Drentwede; 4. Eydelstedt; 3. Bruchhausen-Vilsen; 1. Asendorf; 2. Bruchhausen-Vilsen^{1}; 3. Martfeld; 4. Schwarme; 5. Süstedt	4. Kirchdorf; 1. Bahrenborstel; 2. Barenburg; 3. Freistatt; 4. Kirchdorf^{1}; 5. Varrel; 6. Wehrbleck; 5. Rehden; 1. Barver; 2. Dickel; 3. Hemsloh; 4. Rehden^{1}; 5. Wetschen	6. Schwaförden; 1. Affinghausen; 2. Ehrenburg; 3. Neuenkirchen; 4. Scholen; 5. Schwaförden^{1}; 6. Sudwalde; 7. Siedenburg; 1. Borstel; 2. Maasen; 3. Mellinghausen; 4. Siedenburg^{1}; 5. Staffhorst
	^{1}seat of the Samtgemeinde
