= Freistatt =

- Municipality
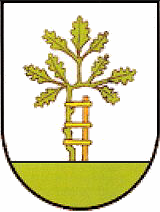
- Coat of arms

- Location of Freistatt within Diepholz district
- Interactive map of Freistatt
- Location within Germany Location within Lower Saxony
- Coordinates: 52°37′N 08°39′E
- Country: Germany
- State: Lower Saxony
- District: Diepholz
- Municipal assoc.: Kirchdorf
- Subdivisions: 2

Government
  - Mayor: Gero Enders

Area
  - Total: 12.54 km^{2} (4.84 sq mi)
- Elevation: 40 m (130 ft)

Population (2025-12-31)
  - Total: 529
  - Density: 42.2/km^{2} (109/sq mi)
- Time zone: UTC+01:00 (CET)
  - Summer (DST): UTC+02:00 (CEST)
- Postal codes: 27259
- Dialling codes: 05448
- Vehicle registration: DH

Freistatt (German pronunciation: [ˈfʁaɪʃtat]) is a municipality in the district of Diepholz which is located in Lower Saxony, Germany.

== See also ==
- German Wikipedia page about Freistatt
