= Lordship of Diepholz =

Lordship, (from ca. 1482/1531) County of Diepholz Herrschaft / Grafschaft Diepholz
- ca. 1070/1085–1585
- Coat of arms
- Status: Lordship
- Capital: Diepholz
- Common languages: West Low German
- Government: Noble Lordship, later County
- Historical era: Middle Ages
  - Folcred cited as noble landowner in Barnstorf: ca. 890/990
  - Allod of the Noble Lords of Diepholz starts to consolidate into a united fiefdom: ca. 1070/1085
  - Cono I and Wilhelm de Thefholte (of Diepholz) first cited, ruled over allodial goods around Drebber and Diepholz: ca. 1160
  - Konrad V inherits patrimony of the Lords of Blankena and acquires the Vicecomitat of Sudholte: 1285-1291
  - Johann III grants town rights to Diepholz: 1380
  - Rudolf VIII abdicates his allodial sovereignty over Diepholz to Duchy of Brunswick-Lüneburg: 1510-1517
  - Friedrich I introduces the Protestant Reformation into Diepholz: 1528
  - County of Diepholz absorbed by Duchy of Brunswick-Lüneburg: 1585
Preceded by	Succeeded by
Duchy of Saxony / Duchy of Saxony	Duchy of Brunswick-Lüneburg / Duchy of Brunswick-Lüneburg

The County of Diepholz (West Low German: Deefholt), that was first known as the Lordship of Diepholz, was a territory in the Holy Roman Empire in the Lower-Rhenish-Westphalian Circle. It was ruled by the Noble Lords, later Counts, of Diepholz from the late tenth century until 1585, when it was mostly incorporated into the Duchy of Brunswick-Lüneburg.

== Territorial Borders ==
The territory of the County of Diepholz at its greatest extent in the sixteenth century stretched from Colnrade and Goldenstedt in the north to Wehdem, Dielingen and Lemförde in the south. The eastern border was marked by the Wietings Moor (near Barver) and the Neustädter Moor (near Wagenfeld). The western border lay to the west of the Dümmer See (lake). The distance from the northernmost point to the southernmost point of the county was about 47 kilometers whilst the distance from east to west was 22 kilometers at its widest point.

The towns of Diepholz, Drebber and Lemförde, as well as the area around the Auburg Castle (most notably Wagenfeld) fell directly under the allodial rule of the Noble Lords of Diepholz. Their properties in Barnstorf, Goldenstedt and Colnrade fell under the full jurisdiction of the Noble Lords from 1291 in their capacity as holders of the Vicecomitat of Sudholte but was a fief of the Bishop of Munster. The Lords of Diepholz were vassals of the Count of Ravensberg for the tithes of Weddeschen and vassals of the Abbey of Corvey for various smaller goods, such as the "wood tithes" in Bosel. Their tithes in Aschen and Ostenbeck were fiefs of the Counts of Tecklenburg.

The territory of the county includes most of the modern municipalities of Altes Amt Lemförde, Barnstorf, Rehden, Diepholz und Wagenfeld. The former District County of Diepholz (Landkreis Grafschaft Diepholz) was named after the territory.

== The origins of the Noble Lords of Diepholz ==
The family belonged to the Germanic Uradel (ancient nobility) and originated from the border area between the districts (German: Gau) of Westphalia and Angria (German: Engern) in the stem duchy of Saxony. In contrast to neighbouring noble dynasties they were not appointed as territorial counts (Latin: comes; German: Graf) or imperial officeholders by the Holy Roman Emperor but exercised allodial power locally as noble landowners. Whilst their origins go further back in time, the family name first appears in 1160 (in Latinised German) as de Thefholte, and a continuous genealogy of the dynasty only starts with Gottschalk I (cited 1177–1205).

The continuity in ownership of the feudal domains around Drebber, Barnstorf and Goldenstedt, which later belonged to the Noble Lords of Diepholz, suggests that the dynasty descended from or was related to Folcred, who donated a manor in Barnstorf with its serfs around 890–900 to the Abbey of Corvey for the salvation of his brother Alfric's soul. In 1070, another Folker, undoubtedly a descendant of the first, and his wife Badeloch, donated a manor in Goldenstedt to the Bishop of Osnabruck.

The first members of the dynasty of the Noble Lords of Diepholz who can be identified with certainty are domina Gysela, heiress of Drebber and Molbergen, her brother Gottschalk (cited 1080/1088) and his son, Gottschalk, Bishop of Osnabruck (1110-1118). It remains uncertain whether they are agnatic or uterine forebears of the later dynasty. Around 1085 Gysela swapped various goods around Drebber and Diepholz with the Bishop of Osnabruck in return for the manor in Goldenstedt which had previously belonged to Folker. The German historian Carl Heinrich Niedberding speculated, based on the geographical location of these earliest known estates, that the Noble Lords of Diepholz might descend from the Saxon leader Widukind, but noted that there was no firm proof for such a descent.

The title used by the Noble Lords (German: edler Herr / Edelherr) of Diepholz was identical to that of their close neighbours, the Noble Lords of Lippe, and underlined their credentials as sovereign territorial lords and as members of the ancient Saxon nobility.

== The Sovereign Lordship of Diepholz in the Middle Ages ==
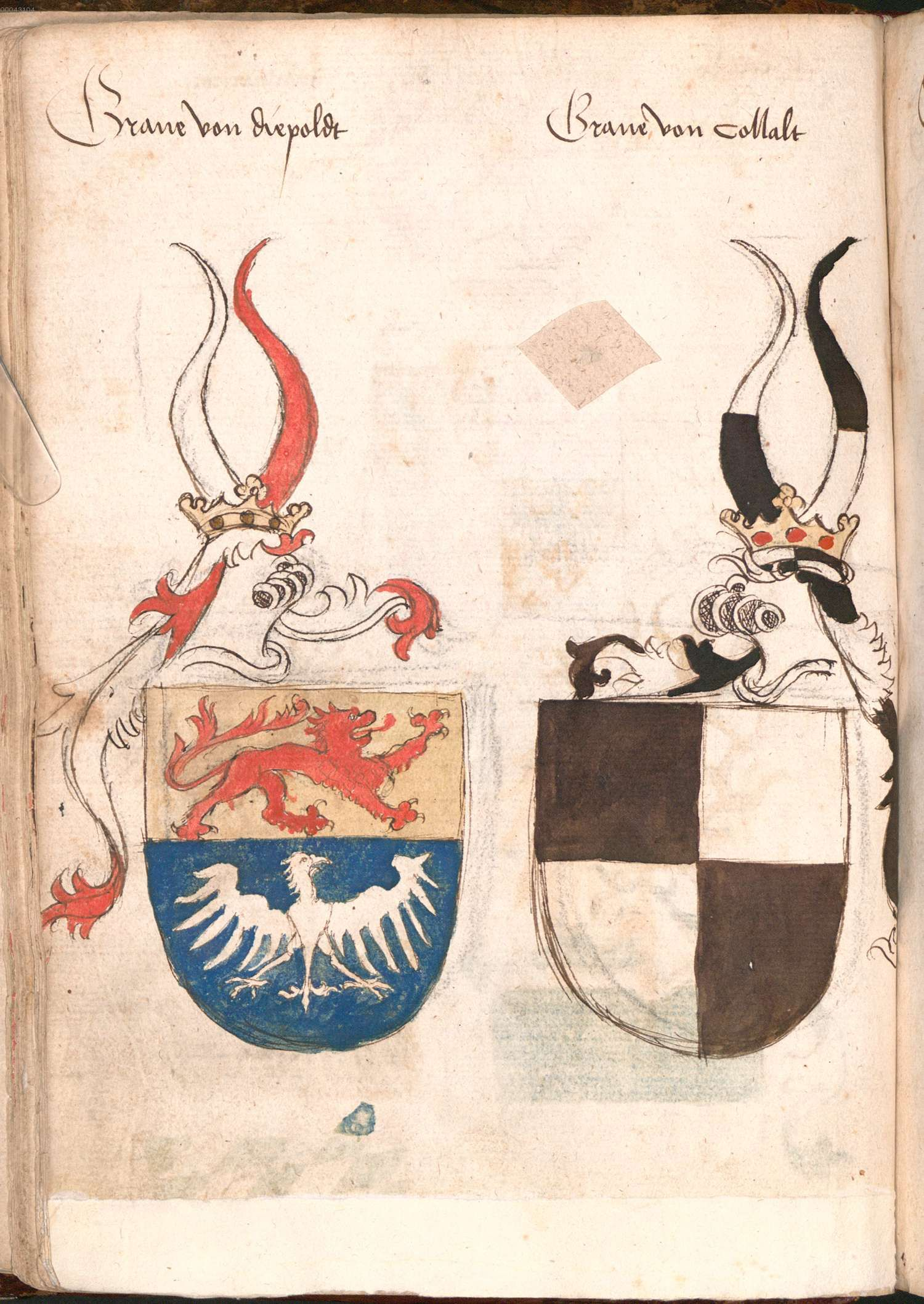
Inverted coat of arms of the Counts of Diepholz (cited as Graue von Diepoldt) (on the left) in the Wernigerode Armorial (ca. 1475-1500).

After the fall of Henry the Lion in the late twelfth century, smaller Saxon territories were able to expand their dominions and influence, and the Noble Lords of Diepholz extended their reach to the north and south from their initial allodial holdings around the town and castle of Diepholz, Drebber, Barnstorf and Goldenstedt. The territory's expansion was however constrained by the moors that surrounded it and by the ambitions of its more powerful neighbours, most notably the Counts of Hoya and the Bishops of Minden.

The dynasty tended to conclude marriages with the sovereigns of neighbouring territories such as the Counts of Oldenburg, Hoya and Rietberg, and in 1285 Noble Lord Rudolf II of Diepholz (died 1303/04) married the daughter of the Swedish King Valdemar (died 1302). In order to prevent a division of the territory's modest resources, younger sons tended to enter religious life as canons in neighbouring bishoprics such as Osnabrück, Minden, Bremen and Cologne, where some of them also ruled as bishops.

The prosperity of the Noble Lords of Diepholz was greatly enhanced by the many members of the family who held high ecclesiastical offices, thus enhancing the dynasty's prestige and allowing it to act with increasing independence within its own domains. Under the joint rule of the brothers Rudolf II and Konrad V (cited 1267–1302), the borders of the Lordship were forcefully expanded and sovereignty attained within their core territories by the acquisition in 1291 of the Vicecomitat of Sudholte, which gave them full jurisdiction over their subjects in the parishes of Drebber, Barnstorf and Goldenstedt. In addition, in 1285, Konrad V, inherited the rich patrimony of the Lords of Blankena from his cousin, Hermann von Blankena.

Konrad V's son, Rudolf IV (cited 1300–1350), continued to actively extend his possessions by his forceful and considered interventions during a very tumultuous period in the region. In 1350, together with his sons and grandchildren, he founded the parish church of Diepholz (which had previously been in Drebber), which he dedicated to Saints Nicholas, Catherine and Elisabeth.

In 1380, Johann III (cited 1373–1422), the grandson of Rudolf IV, granted town rights to Diepholz. His reign was marked by continuous tensions and conflict with and between neighbouring territories in which Diepholz was largely spared any major depredation. His son, Konrad IX, died as an ally of the Archbishop of Bremen in a battle near Detern in 1426, whilst engaging the Frisian forces of Focko Ukena.

In 1441 Otto IV, Konrad IX's son, married Heilwig van Bronkhorst, thanks to the diplomatic efforts of his uncle, Bishop Rudolf van Diepholt of Utrecht. The marriage dowry included properties in the surroundings of Wagenfeld, Bokel and Struten, which consolidated the dynasty's hold on the lands around the Auburg castle to the east of their territories. This marriage would also form the basis of the Count of Diepholz's later claims to Bronkhorst when that dynasty died out in 1553.

== From Lordship to County ==
In accordance with their sovereign status and motivated by their marital alliances with neighbouring sovereign counts, the Noble Lords of Diepholz started titling themselves as Counts of Diepholz during the course of the fifteenth century. Rudolf VIII (died 1510) was the first dynast to describe himself as Count of Diepholz in 1482, and Carl Heinrich Niedberding claims that this pretension was recognised by the Emperor Maximilian I. His son, Friedrich I (died 1529), also regularly used the title in his charters and edicts. The comtal title only came to be generally recognised under Count Johann VI. After the extinction of the main line of the Lords of Bronkhorst in 1553, the Counts of Diepholz also laid claim to that territory based on their descent from Heilwig of Bronkhorst, and subsequently titled themselves Counts of Diepholz and Bronkhorst.

== The County of Diepholz in the Early Modern Period ==
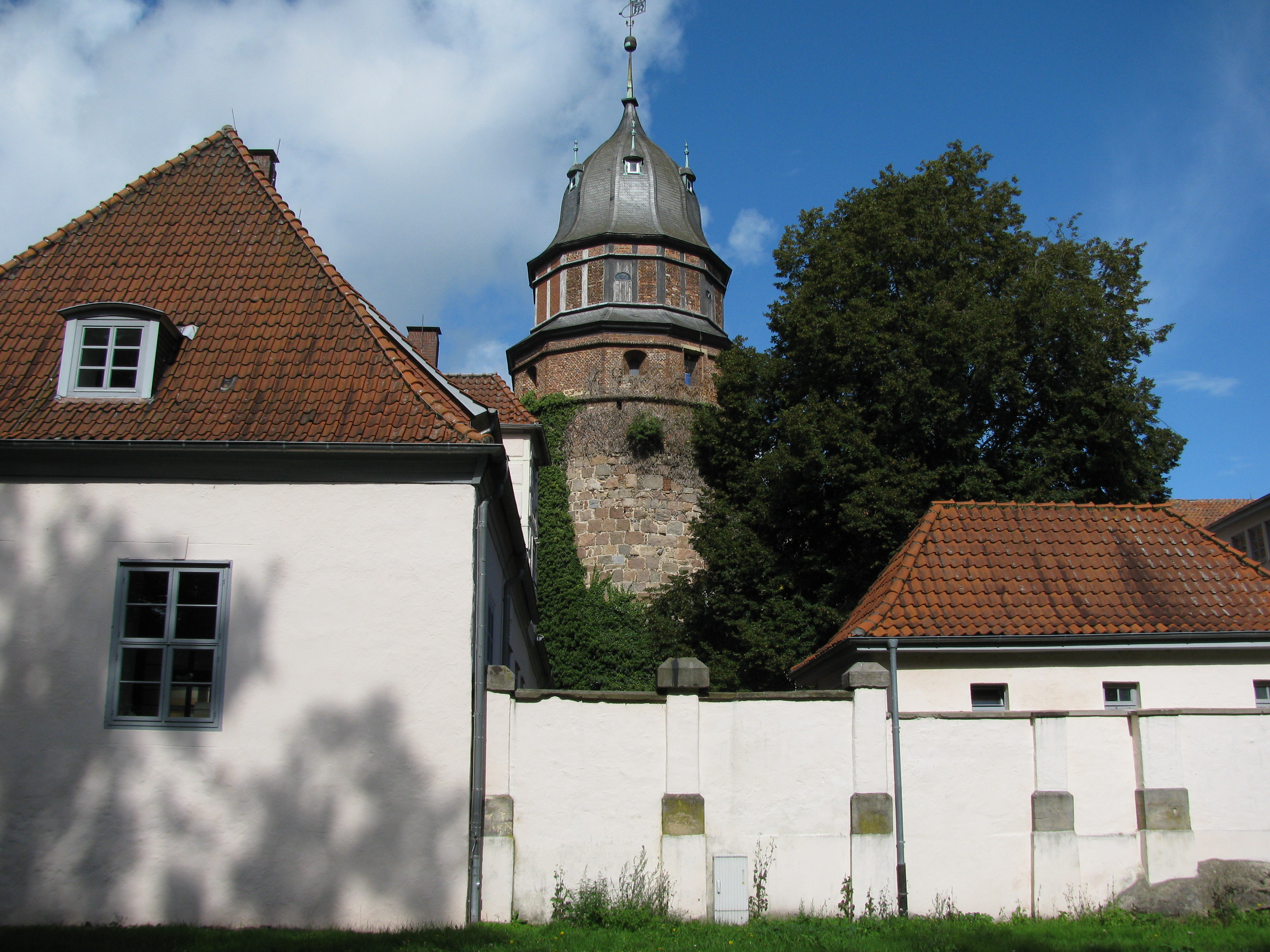
Diepholz Castle, the principal seat of the Noble Lords, later Counts, of Diepholz.

Under constant threat from his more powerful neighbours and after endless hostilities with the Bishop of Minden, Rudolf VIII, son of Otto IV and Heilwig van Bronkhorst, abdicated his absolute sovereignty over Diepholz in 1510 and recognised the Duke of Brunswick-Lüneburg as his liege lord in return for the promise of his protection. This agreement was only formally recognised as valid by the Emperor Maximilian I in 1517. The moor-covered territory of Diepholz had never been particularly wealthy and from Rudolf VIII's reign onwards the dynasty continuously struggled to cover the costs of its administration and the obligations of their semi-sovereign lifestyle.

After the death of Rudolf VIII of Diepholz in 1510, his three sons, Friedrich I, Konrad XII and Johann VI initially ruled over Diepholz as co-sovereigns. The limited means which the territory disposed over however led the brothers to sign a treaty in 1514 recognising Friedrich I as sole ruler and making financial arrangements for the two other brothers to become canons in Cologne. Friedrich's territories were constantly under attack by the Bishop of Minden, despite the fact that the Archbishop of Cologne, the Pope and the Holy Roman Emperor had issued Inhibitoria instructing the bishop to cease hostilities.

In 1519 Friedrich I joined the coalition of the Prince-Bishop of Hildesheim in the Hildesheim Diocesan Feud (German: Hildesheimer Stiftsfehde), which led to him and his allies being placed under the imperial ban by Emperor Charles V. To further protect his estates while under the imperial ban, Friedrich I, relinquished sovereignty over the territories around Auburg to Landgrave Philip I of Hesse in 1521, who subsequently re-enfeoffed him with them, thus losing the last vestige of full allodial sovereignty that had not already been abdicated to the Dukes of Brunswick-Calenberg. In 1523 Friedrich I married Eva von Regenstein, by whom he had a son and daughter, and under whose influence in 1528 he introduced the Reformation into the County of Diepholz.

When Friedrich I died in 1529, whilst visiting his sister Imgard in the Abbey of Essen, his brother, Johann VI, returned from Cologne and seized power in Diepholz. He formally agreed with his sister-in-law, Eva of Regenstein, that he would conclude a morganatic marriage in order not to impinge on the rights of his nephew, Rudolf IX, son of Friedrich I, when he came of age. Johann VI also took care to sign his edicts and charters on behalf of both himself and his nephew. Count Rudolf IX succeeded his uncle in 1545, and married his cousin, Margarete of Hoya-Nienburg, in 1549, by whom he had a son and a daughter. Their son, Friedrich II, died in 1585, but only left a daughter, Anna Margaretha (died without issue in 1629), by his marriage to Anastasia of Waldeck, who was unable to succeed according to the strictures of Saxon inheritance law. As a result of the 1510 treaty recognising the Duke of Brunswick-Lüneburg as its liege lord, most of the county was therefore absorbed into the Welf duchy. Auburg and its surrounding territories fell to the Landgraviate of Hesse.

Irmgard of Diepholz, daughter of Rudolf VIII and Elisabeth of Lippe, had entered Essen Abbey as a religious in 1505 and slowly rose through the ranks to become Princess-Abbess in 1561. Her election as Princess-Abbess procured far greater wealth and influence than her family in Diepholz enjoyed, and she generously dispensed patronage to her niece, Anna von Diepholt, daughter of Friedrich I, who was married to a local nobleman, Adolf von Schuren, Lord of Horst an der Ruhr (died 1552). Anna's son, Evert von Schuren, and his cousins, Count Friedrich II and his sister, Anna, the Coadjutrix of Bassum, were the only heirs of Irmgard when she died in 1575.

== The East-Frisian and Dutch branches of the Diepholz dynasty ==
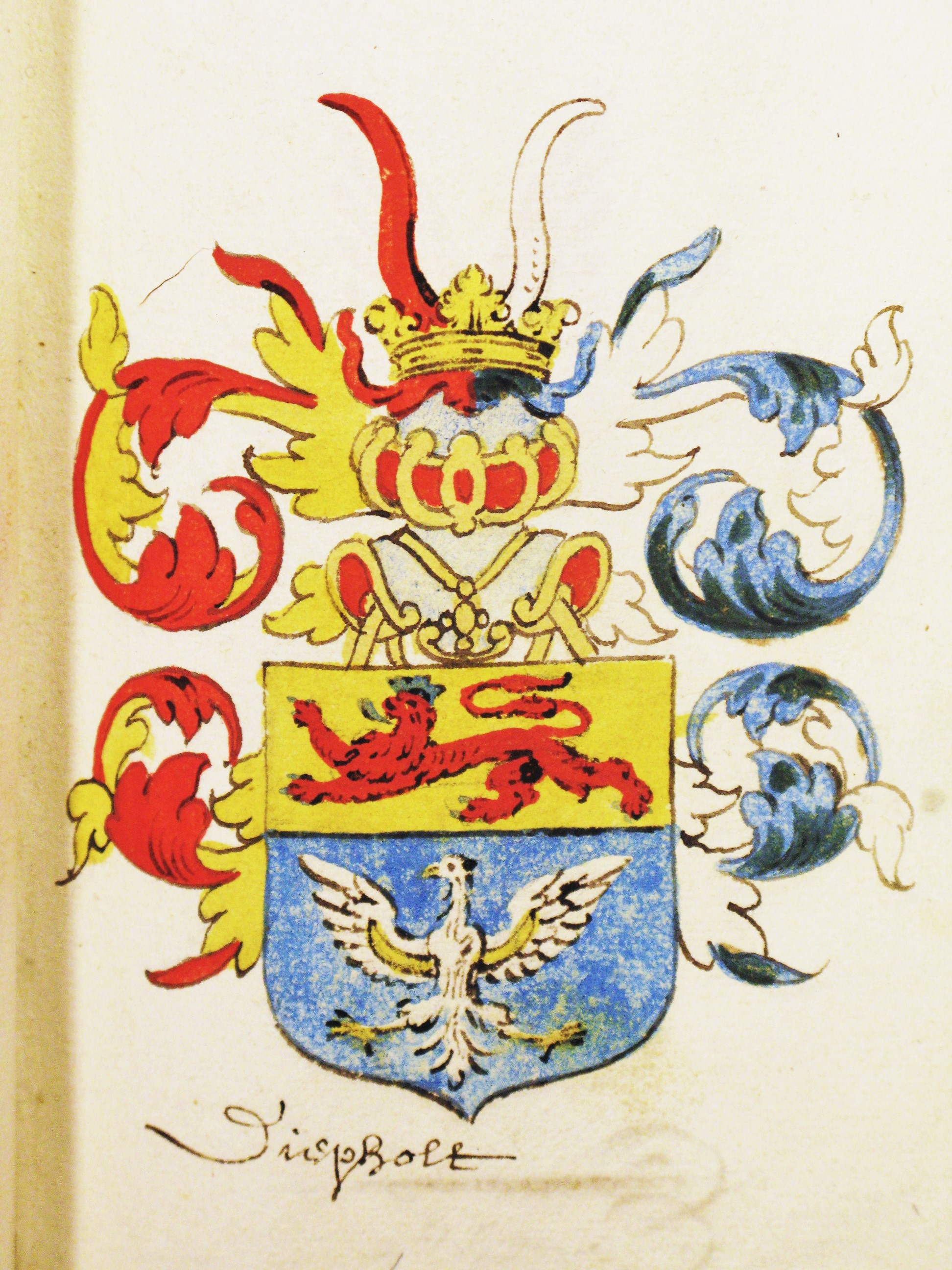
Arms of the Van Diepholt family of Utrecht

Rudolf IV, succeeded his father as sovereign of Diepholz in 1484, thanks to the premature death of his older brother, Konrad XI (died 1483), who had left progeny by an unknown partner. Konrad XI's son, Otto von Diepholt, married the Frisian noblewoman, Anna Remets Ubbena, sister of Dr. Hayo "Hermannus Phrysius" Hompen, humanist scholar, Imperial Councillor and correspondent of Erasmus, and half-sister of Wilhelm Ubbena, Chancellor of East-Frisia.

Otto was initially a commander of the forces of Count Edzard I of East-Frisia in the Saxon Feud, but later became a supporter and legate of the Habsburg dynasty in the Netherlands, who appointed him as imperial warden in Amersfoort in 1538. He was buried in Emden around 1540.

Otto's eldest son, Coenraat van Diepholt (died 1572), married Fransken van IJsselstein, daughter of Christoffel van IJsselstein and the illegitimate niece of Floris van Egmont, Count of Buren. He was Marshal of the Nether-Bishopric (Nedersticht) of Utrecht and Montfoort and acted as castellan of Abcoude. Coenraat's children, Floris and Francisca, left progeny in the Netherlands and Germany.

Jost von Diepholt (died after 1573), Otto's second son, married Almuth Ukena, whose father, Rudolph Cirksena, was a bastard son of Enno I of East Frisia, (brother of Edzard I of East Frisia). This couple became the ancestors of the noble Von Diepholt family of East-Frisia.

== List of the Noble Lords and Counts of Diepholz ==
- ca 1160: Cono (Konrad) I and Wilhelm I
- from 1177: Gottschalk I
- from 1219: Rudolf I (until after 1242) and his brother, Cono III (until 1233), sons of Gottschalk I.
- 1233/42–1265: Johann II, son of Cono III, married Hedwig of Roden, daughter of Hildebold II, Count of Roden and Limmer.
- 1265-1304: Rudolf II, son of Johann II, co-ruler of Diepholz, married firstly Agnes of Cleves, daughter of Dietrich IV "Nust", Count of Cleves, married secondly Marina, Princess of Sweden, daughter of Valdemar, King of Sweden; died without issue.
- 1265-1310: 1265–1302: Konrad V, son of Johann II and brother of Rudolf II, co-ruler in Diepholz with his brother, he had inherited the extensive Blankena domains from his cousin, Hermann von Blankena, in 1285, married Hedwig of Rietberg, daughter of Friedrich I, Count of Rietberg.
- 1310–1350: Rudolf IV, son of Konrad V, married Jutta of Oldenburg-Delmenhorst, daughter of Otto II, Count of Oldenburg in Delmenhorst.
- 1350–1378: Konrad VII, son of Rudolf IV, married (secondly) Armgard of Waldeck, daughter of Heinrich IV, Count of Waldeck.
- 1378–1422: Johann III, son of Konrad VII, married Kunigunde of Oldenburg, daughter of Konrad II, Count of Oldenburg in Oldenburg.
- 1422–1426: Konrad IX, son of Johann II, died in battle at Detern, married Irmgard of Hoya, daughter of Otto III, Count of Hoya.
- 1426–1484: Otto IV, son of Konrad IX, married Heilwig van Bronkhorst, daughter of Otto, Lord of Bronkhorst.
- 1484–1510: Rudolf VIII, son of Otto IV, first Noble Lord to title himself Count of Diepholz, relinquished his absolute sovereignty over Diepholz to the Duchy of Brunswick-Luneburg in return for its protection, married Elisabeth of Lippe, daughter of Bernhard VII "Bellicosus", Noble Lord of Lippe.
- 1510-1514: Co-Lordship of the brothers Friedrich I, Johann VI and Konrad XII, sons of Rudolf VII; the brothers signed a treaty in 1514 allocating sole rule to Friedrich I.
- 1510-1529: Friedrich I (as sole Noble Lord / Count), married Eva von Regenstein, daughter of Ulrich VIII, Count of Regenstein and Blankenburg.
- 1529–1545: Johann VI, brother of Friedrich I, his use of the title of Count of Diepholz was generally recognised, he seized the county after the death of his brother and ruled as sovereign count during his nephew's minority.
- 1545–1560: Rudolf IX, son of Friedrich I, married Margarete of Hoya, daughter of Jobst II, Count of Hoya in Nienburg.
- 1575–1585: Friedrich II (1560–1575), son of Friedrich I, married Anastasia of Waldeck; their only daughter could not by dynastic law inherit the county, which therefore fell to the Duchy of Brunswick-Luneburg.

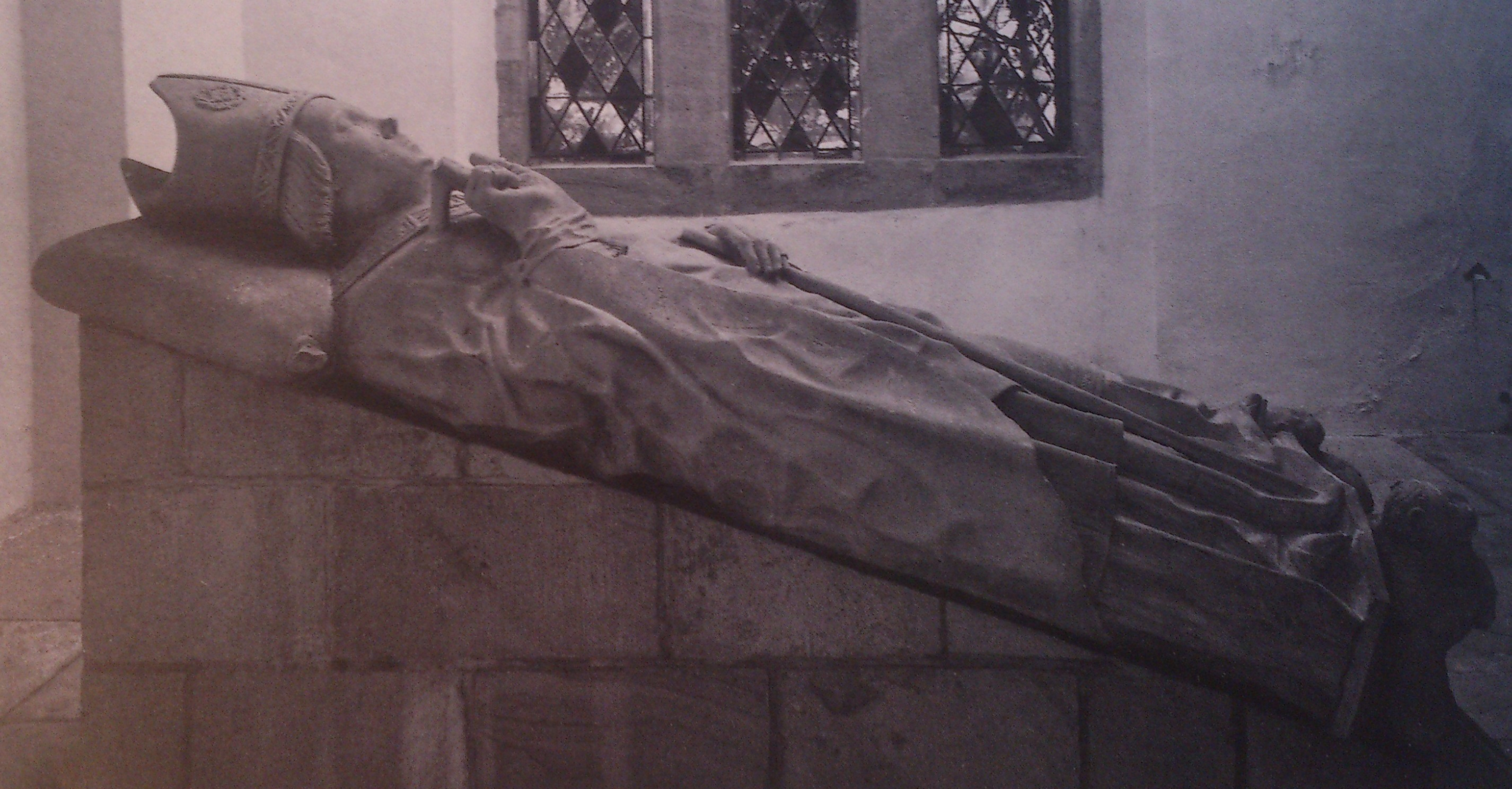
Tomb of Konrad III of Diepholz, Bishop of Osnabruck

== Notable members of the Diepholz dynasty in religious life ==
- Princess-Abbesses of Essen
  - 1489-1505: Irmgard (as Anti-Princess-Abbess)
  - 1561-1575: Irmgard
- Bishops of Minden
  - 1236–1242: Wilhelm
  - 1242–1253: Johann
  - 1261–1266: Konrad
- Bishops of Osnabrück
  - 1109–1119: Gottschalk
  - 1424–1437: Johann
  - 1454–1455: Rudolf
  - 1455–1482: Konrad
- Bishops of Utrecht
  - 1423–1455: Rudolf van Diepholt

== Castles and Seats ==
- Auburg Castle
- Diepholz Castle
- Cornau
- Lembruch
- Lemförde

== See also ==
- Diepholz (town)
- Diepholz (district)
- Rudolf van Diepholt

== Literature ==
- Bach, Otto, Heimatgeschichte im Spiegel der Karte, Diepholz 1999.
- Gade, Heinrich, Historisch-geographisch-statistische Beschreibung der Grafschaften Hoya und Diepholz. Nienburg 1901.
- Giesen, Klaus, Die Münzen von Diepholz. Osnabrück 2001.
- Guttzeit, Emil Johannes, Geschichte der Stadt Diepholz, Diepholz 1982.
- Hucker, Berend Ulrich, „Genealogie und Wappen der Edelherren von Diepholz in 12. und 13. Jahrhundert“ in Norddeutsche Familienkunde, Jahrgang 1990, pp. 180–188.
- Kinghorst, Dr. Wilhelm, Die Graffschaft Diepholz zur Zeit ihres Überganges an das Haus Braunschweig-Lüneburg. Beiträge zur Geschichte der Graffschaft Diepholz in sechzehnten Jahrhundert, Diepholz 1912 (reprinted 1979).
- Moormeyer, Willy Die Grafschaft Diepholz. Göttingen 1938.
- Museum Nienburg: Die Grafschaften Bruchhausen, Diepholz, Hoya und Wölpe. Nienburg 2000.
- Nieberding, C.H., Geschichte des ehemaligen Niederstifts Münster und der angränzenden Grafschaften Diepholz, Wildeshausen, etc., Vechta 1840 (reprinted 1967).
- Rootenberg, Francesco Uys, Het geslacht Van Diepholt in het Sticht en Westfalen en hun verwantschap aan de graven van Buren, Kaapstad 2015.
- Schwennicke, Detlev, Europäische Stammtafeln (neue Folge), Band XVII, Tafel 130 (Diepholz), Frankurt am Main 1998.
- Vaterländisches Archiv des historischen Vereins für Niedersachsen, Luneburg 1837: „Nachrichten von der adlichen Familie von Diepholt in Ostfriesland“, pp. 12 –16.
