= Wagenfelder Aue =

River in Germany

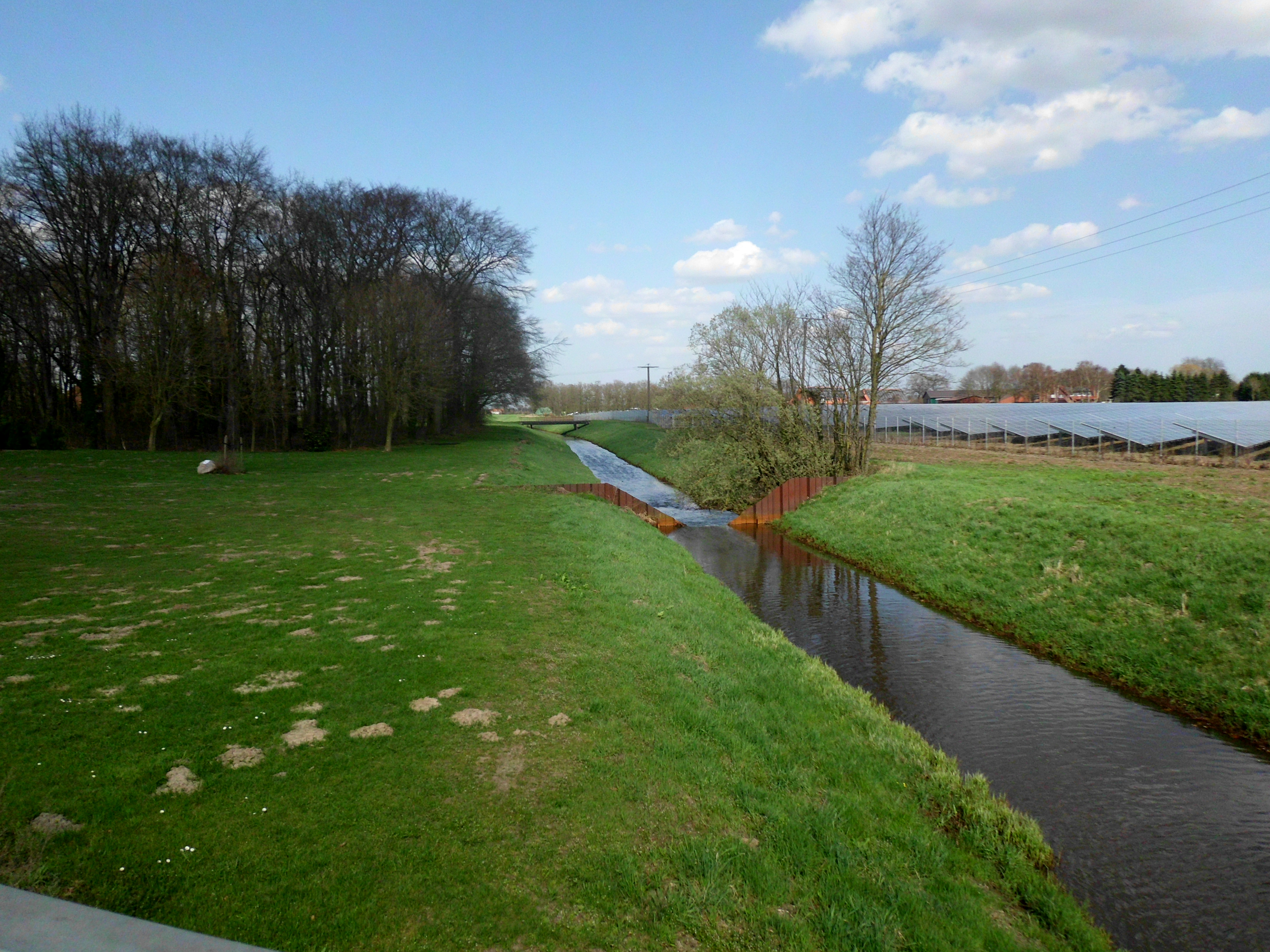
- Wagenfelder Aue (looking north)

Location
- Country: Germany
- State: Lower Saxony
- District: Diepholz

Physical characteristics
- Source
  - location: Southern Wagenfeld
  - coordinates: 52°31′54″N 08°34′24″E
- Mouth
  - location: South of Barnstorf
  - coordinates: 52.6951°N 8.5256°E
- Length: 26.3 km (16.3 mi)

Basin features
- Progression: Hunte→ Weser→ North Sea

Wagenfelder Aue is a river of Lower Saxony, Germany, a right tributary of the Hunte.

The Wagenfelder Aue's total length is 26 kilometres (16 mi), entirely contained within the southern part of the district of Diepholz. It drains a large area of marshland.

The river rises south of the centre of Wagenfeld and flows northwards through the town, forming the border between the Samtgemeindes (collective municipalities) of Barnstorf and Rehden before discharging into the Hunte south of Barnstorf.

== See also ==
- List of rivers of Lower Saxony
