= Dadau =

River in Germany

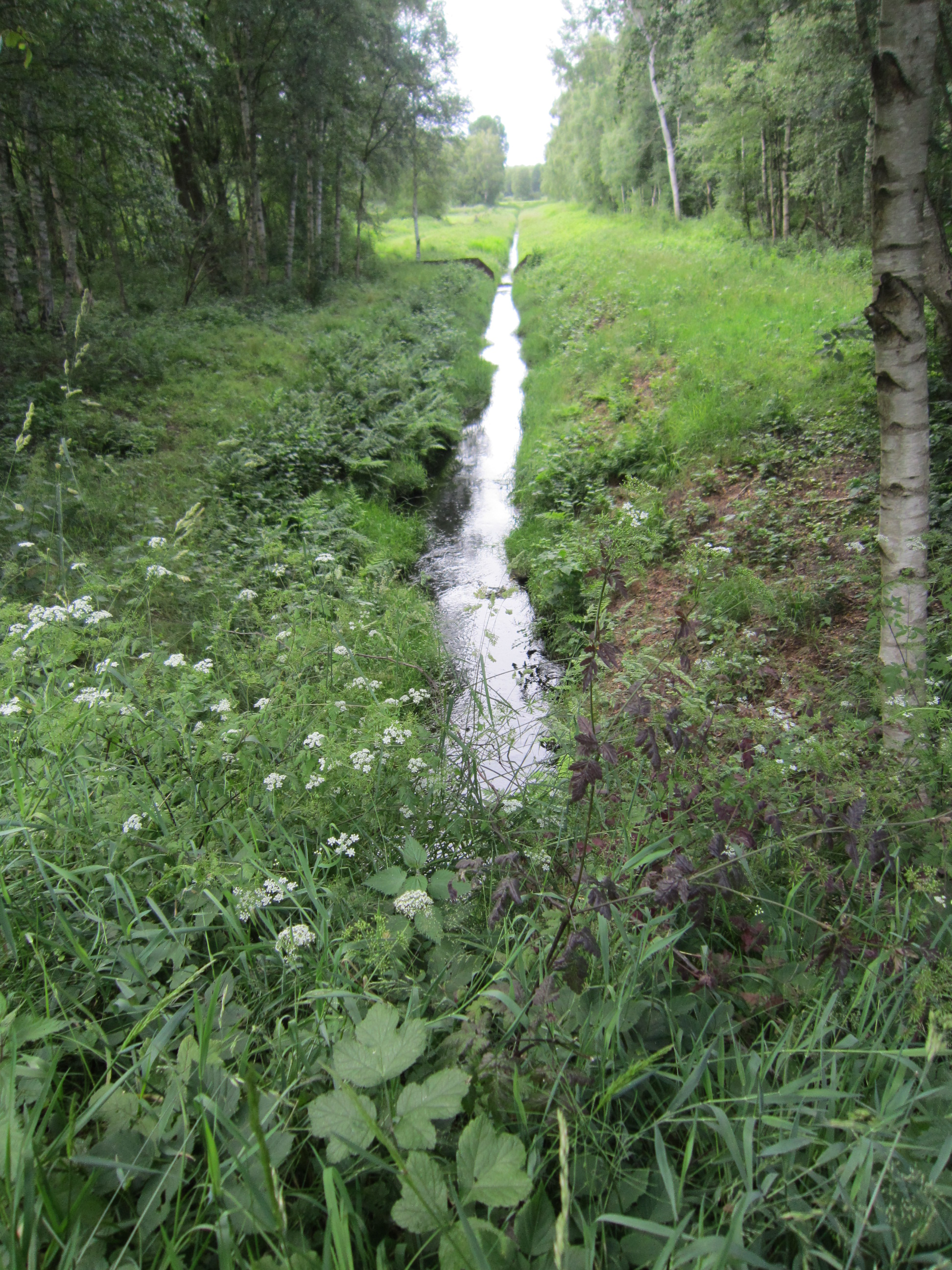

Location
- Country: Germany
- State: Lower Saxony

Physical characteristics
- Source
  - elevation: 7 m (23 ft)
- Mouth
  - location: in Cornau (Drebber) in the Hunte
  - coordinates: 52.6685°N 8.4602°E
  - elevation: 33 m (108 ft)
- Length: 18.9 km (11.7 mi)

Basin features
- Progression: Hunte→ Weser→ North Sea

The Dadau is a left tributary of the river Hunte. For most of its upper course it forms the boundary between the districts of Diepholz and Vechta and for a shorter distance along its lower reaches it forms the boundary between the town of Diepholz and the collective municipality of Barnstorf.

== Course ==
The 18.9-kilometre-long (11.7 mi) Dadau has its source in the Diepholz Moor Depression in the Südlohn Moor near the town of Lohne. Then it flows northwards between the Südlohn and Brägel Moors to the west and the Aschen Moor to the east and then turns to head east at the boundary between Lohne and Vechta on its left bank. Beyond the B 69 federal road, the Dadau flows in an easterly, and sometimes south-easterly, direction. In its final section it runs through (upstream its right bank belongs to Diepholz) the municipal area of Drebber. The Dadau joins the Hunte a few metres east of the B 51 in Cornau, a part of Drebber. The Hunte carries on flowing northwards towards Oldenburg. Between the Hunte and the Dadau is Deckau, also a part of Drebber.

In 2003, the towns of Vechta and Diepholz as well as the municipal area of Drebber decided to align their boundaries with the current route of the Dadau. In 2004, the administrative districts which would have been affected, agreed to this change of their borders. Altogether Diepholz was increased in size by 0.8323 ha (8323sq mi) at Vechta's expense.

== History ==
Near the mouth of the Dadau, the water castle of Cornau, the castle of the district Diepholz as part of the Holy Roman Empire, was located between the Dadau and the Hunte, from where the area was ruled up until the castle in Diepholz was constructed. There was a moat to the west of the castle Cornau, which closed the gap between Dadau and Hunte. The rest of the moat was filled up in 1962. The castle has been falling into ruin since the 15th century. Until 1751 its remains were removed.

The Dadau has since Reformation Times been marking the border of areas with a predominantly Roman Catholic population from other areas with a predominantly Evangelical, Lutheran population. To the west of this border lay the Niederstift Münster, the Free State of Oldenburg with the region of Oldenburger Münsterland as well as the Regierungsbezirk Weser-Ems in Lower Saxony. To the east of the border is the district of Diepholz, The Kingdom of Hanover, The Kingdom of Prussia as well as the Regierungsbezirk Hannover in Lower Saxony.

== Water quality ==
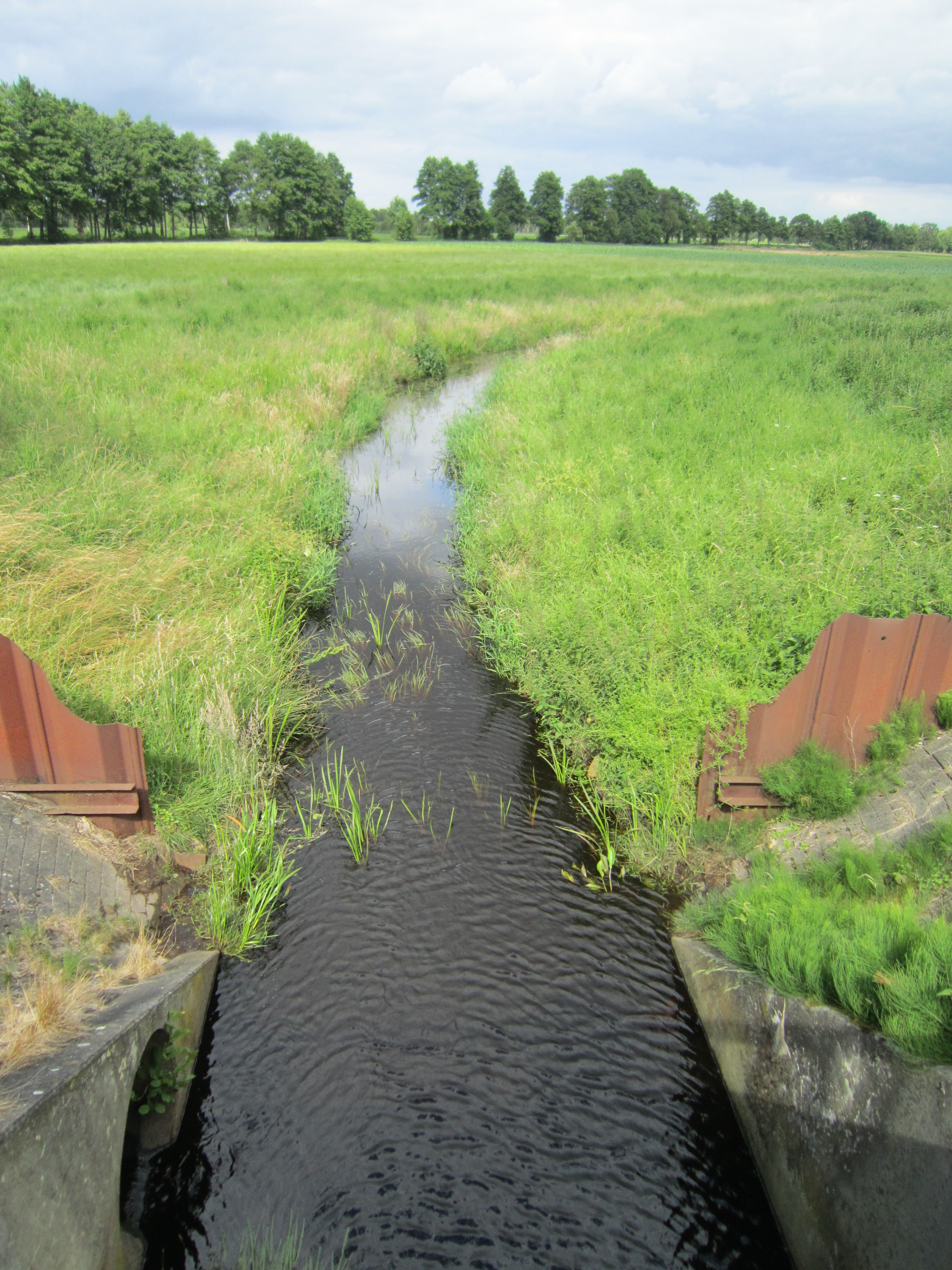
The Dadau east of federal highway 69

In 2004 the Dadau's and adjacent streams' water quality were valued negatively by qualified public authorities in Lower Saxony: "The organically and sand-filled lowland streams of the western Duemmer's depression were graded as moderate to unsatisfactory. Fastidious organisms, who could indicate a good condition, were hard to find. A relatively high amount of moors were run through [by affected streams]. Due to mostly intensive drainage of the moor areas, the waters are more or less influenced by swamp water. The released swamp-like substances from humans have led to high organic charges of the waters. Iron and nutrients have been released to a considerable extent and have led to eutrophication of consumptive oxide degradation processes and sapropel formations. This process will be benefited by minor shading and reducing the flow rate through jams and pipe colverts."

The "Integrated rural development concept" (ILEK) [Districts] Vechta/Central-South provides a revitalisation, the "Integrated urban development concept (ISEK) of Lohne, a renaturation of the Dadau.

== See also ==
- List of rivers of Lower Saxony

== Literature ==
- Taubenrauch, Heiko (2008). "Die Hoheitsgrenze im Moor". Laon-Lohne 2008 (in German). Lohne: Heimatverein Lohne. pp. 7–23.
