= Walter Steffens (gymnast) =

German gymnast (1908–2006)

- Full name: Walter Johan Heinrich Steffens
- Born: 26 December 1908 Barnstorf, German Empire
- Died: 23 August 2006 (aged 97) Barnstorf, Germany

Gymnastics career
- Discipline: Men's artistic gymnastics
- Country represented: Germany
- Gym: Sportverein Barnstorf
Medal record
Men's artistic gymnastics
Representing Germany
Olympic Games
Gold medal – first place	1936 Berlin	Team

Walter Johan Heinrich Steffens (26 December 1908 – 23 August 2006) was a German gymnast who won an Olympic gold medal.

He was born in Barnstorf, the son of a family of craftsmen. In the 1930s, he was one of the best in the world on the pommel horse. In the 1936 Summer Olympics in Berlin, he won a gold medal as part of the German team, along with Alfred Schwarzmann and others. He was a sports instructor at the Hamm Gymnasium and at the Freiherr-vom-Stein-Realschule in Bergkamen.
