= Lohne, Germany =

Lohne (Oldenburg)
- Town
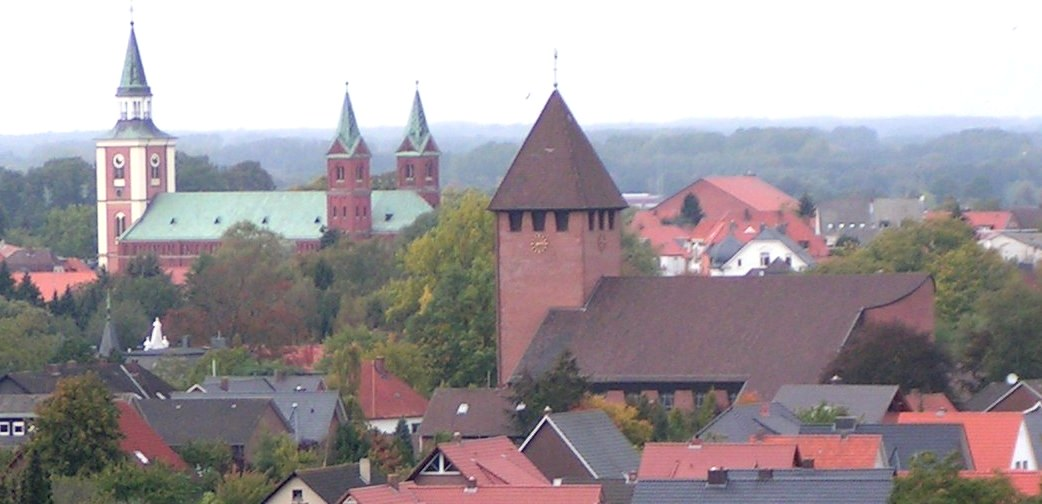
- Churches of Saint Gertrud (left) and Saint Joseph (right)

- Coat of arms

- Location of Lohne (Oldenburg) within Vechta district
- Interactive map of Lohne (Oldenburg)
- Location within Germany Location within Lower Saxony
- Coordinates: 52°40′0″N 08°14′19″E
- Country: Germany
- State: Lower Saxony
- District: Vechta
- Subdivisions: 19 districts

Government
  - Mayor: Henrike Voet (CDU)

Area
  - Total: 91.11 km^{2} (35.18 sq mi)
- Elevation: 44 m (144 ft)

Population (2025-12-31)
  - Total: 28,114
  - Density: 308.6/km^{2} (799.2/sq mi)
- Time zone: UTC+01:00 (CET)
  - Summer (DST): UTC+02:00 (CEST)
- Postal codes: 49393
- Dialling codes: 04442
- Vehicle registration: VEC
- Website: www.lohne.de

Lohne (Oldenburg) (German pronunciation: [ˈloːnə]; Northern Low Saxon: Lohn) is a town in the district of Vechta, in Lower Saxony, Germany. It is located about 8 km south-west of Vechta. The town lies on the A1 freeway between Bremen and Osnabrück.

== Geography ==
=== Geographical position ===
Lohne lies in the Oldenburg Münsterland between Oldenburg to the north and Osnabrück to the south. Through the city goes the Weser-Ems-watershed from north to south. In the east is the catchment area of the Hunte and in the west the catchment area of the Hase, which lies on a Geest, part of the Dammer Berge.

To the east of Lohne lies the Großes Moor, a raised bog. To the west lies the "Dinklager Becken", a great lowland. Drainage occurs by the rivulets "Hopener Mühlenbach" and "Bokerner Bach" into the Hase and "Dadau" into the Hunte.

In the east, next to the "Großes Moor" lie two more raised bogs, the "Brägeler Moor" and the "Südlohner Moor". The "Südlohner Moor" is a protected landscape. A small part of the "Steinfelder Moor" is protected too. It lies in Kroge-Ehrendorf, south of the federal road B214.

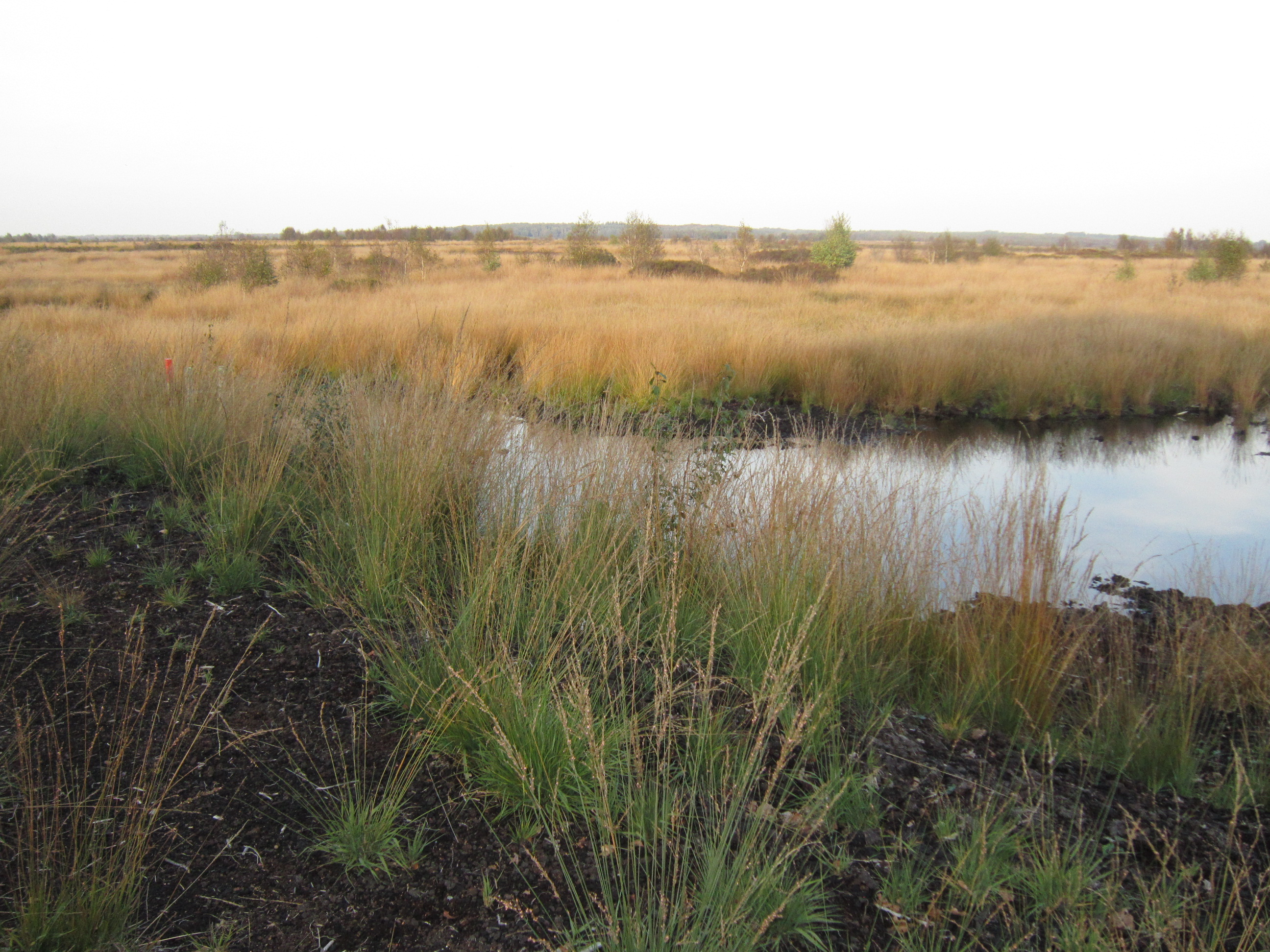
Protected landscape "Südlohner Moor"

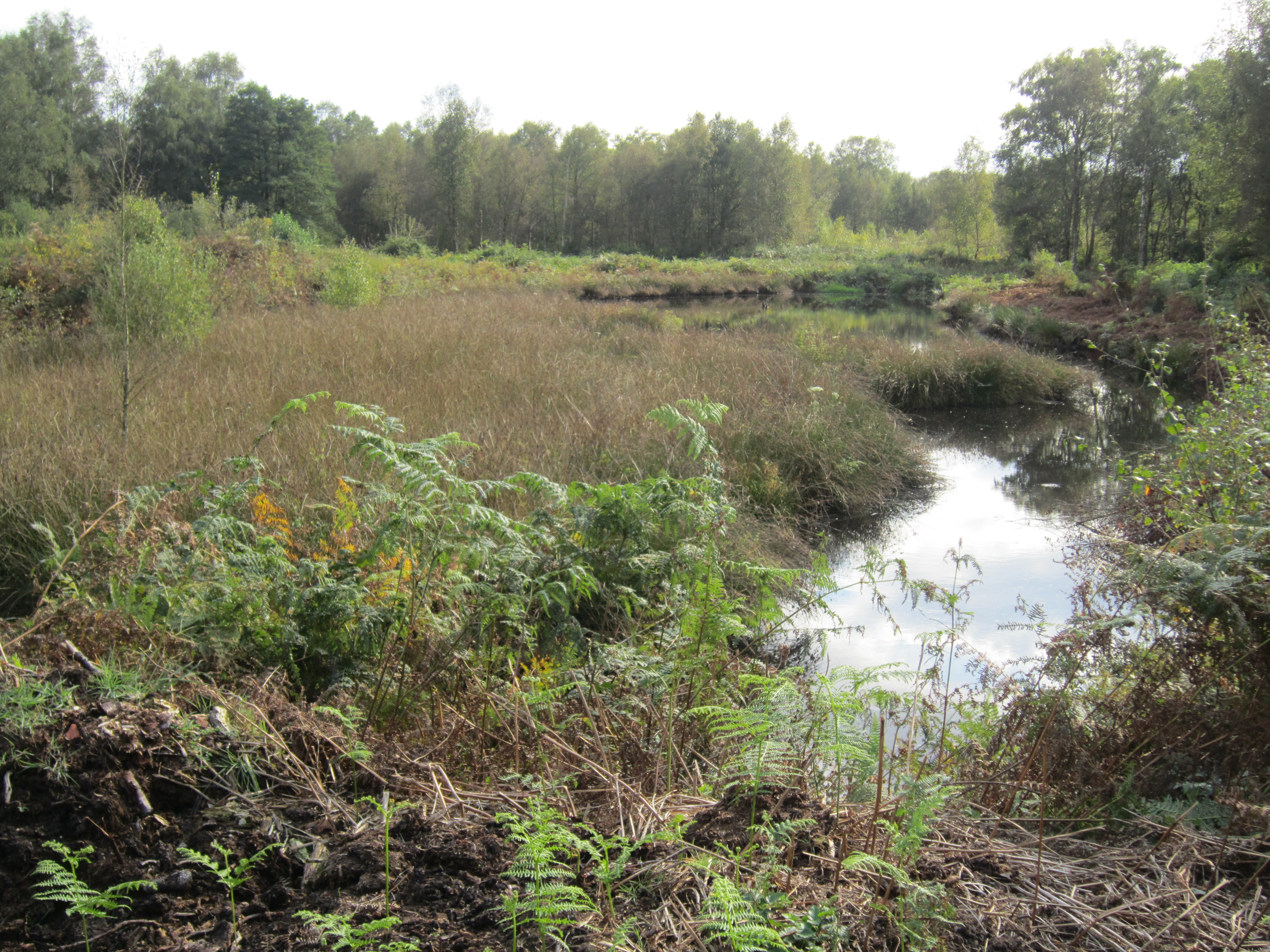
Protected landscape "Steinfelder Moor"

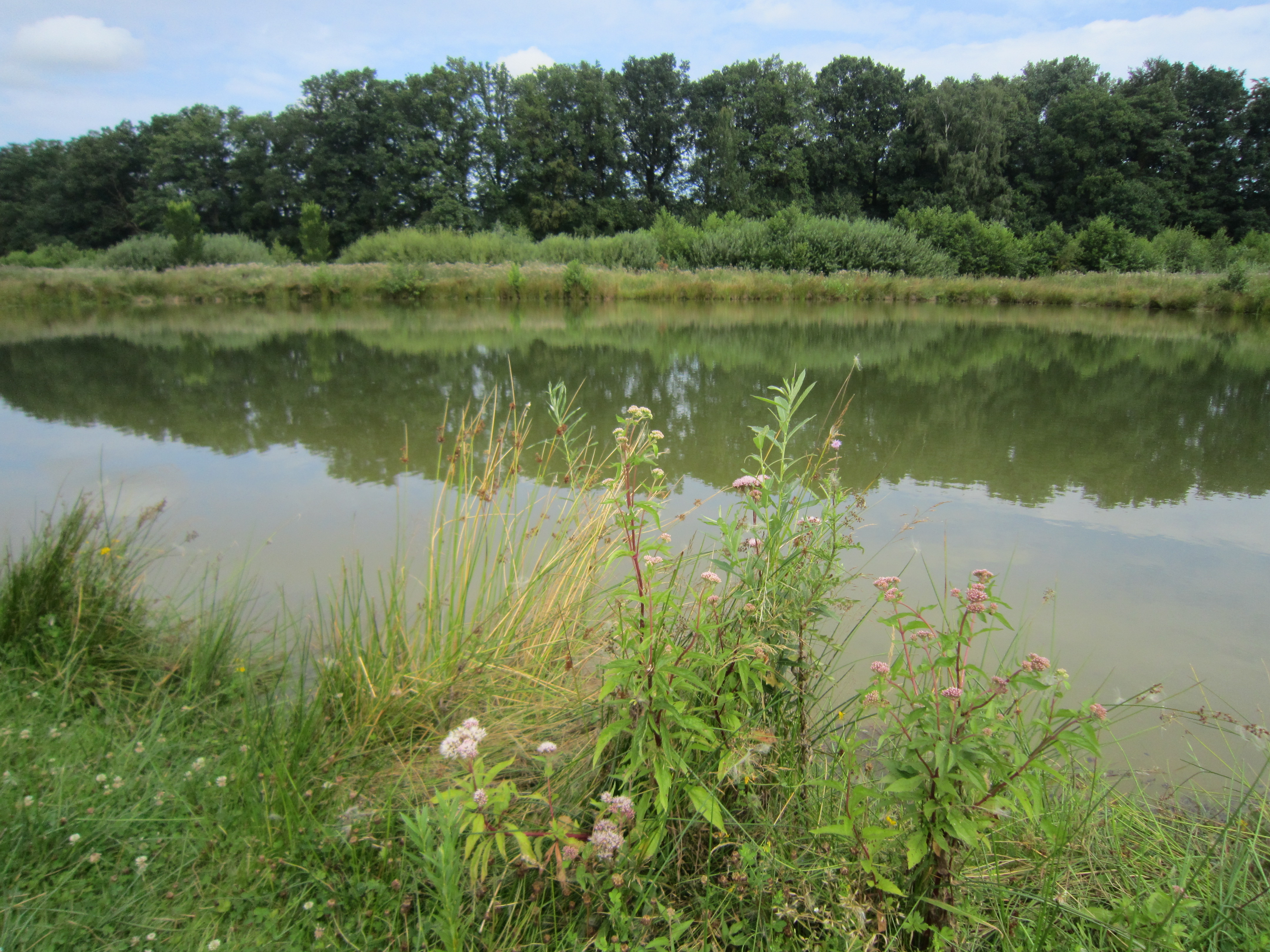
Fishing pond "Runenbrock"

=== Districts ===
- Bokern
- Brägel
- Brettberg
- Brockdorf
- Hamberg
- Hopen
- Krimpenfort
- Kroge-Ehrendorf
- Lerchental
- Lohnerwiesen
- Märschendorf
- Meyerfelde
- Moorkamp
- Mühlenkamp
- Nordlohne
- Rießel
- Schellohne
- Südlohne
- Voßberg
- Vulhop
- Wichel
- Zentrum
- Zerhusen

=== Neighbourship of Lohne ===
The neighbourship of Lohne, clockwise, start in the north:

- The city Vechta (District Vechta)
- The municipality Barnstorf (District Diepholz)
- The municipality Drebber (District Diepholz)
- The city Diepholz (District Diepholz)
- The municipality Steinfeld (District Vechta)
- The municipality Holdorf (District Vechta)
- The city Dinklage (District Vechta)
- The municipality Bakum (District Vechta)

Bakum (9 km)	Vechta (8 km)	Barnstorf (18 km)
Dinklage (8 km)		Drebber (13 km)
Holdorf (11 km)	Steinfeld (9 km)	Diepholz (12 km)

The distance is town center to town center.

== Twin towns – sister cities ==
Lohne is twinned with:

- Rixheim, France (1987)
- Międzylesie, Poland (2010)

== Economy ==
As a "city of special industries", Lohne has also made a name for itself nationwide. As early as 1900, Lohne had an injection moulding factory, a machine factory, two paintbrush and one brush factories, a mechanical weaving mill, a sausage factory, several brickworks including cement industry, a peat factory, a cardboard packaging factory and a large number of other production facilities. Lohne's industry was characterized less by size than by its specialization. Since the 1950s, the plastics industry has been the mainstay of the Lohner economy. Today, metalworking companies, machinery and equipment manufacturers, packaging and cartonboard companies, cork manufacturers, as well as the food industry, agriculture and the construction trades ensure that there is a wide variety of industries in Lohne.

The fact that Lohne, as a middle center, is in the same order as the middle center of Vechta, the capital of the district, is shown by the fact, that most of the professional schools in the district are located in Lohne.

Every Thursday and Saturday there is a weekly market on the "Alter Markt", occasionally also on the "Rixheimer Platz".

=== Plastic industries ===
Established plastic industries in Lohne are:

- ATKA Kunststoffverarbeitung
- delo Dettmer-Verpackungen
- Franz Henke Kunststoffwerk & Werkzeugbau
- Kronen-Hansa-Werk
- Nowack
- Polytec Rießelmann
- Pöppelmann
- RPC Bramlage

=== Other companies ===
Lohne has a wide range of small, medium and large companies. These are for example:

- EnviTec Biogas AG (producer for biogas plants)
- PHW Group (biggest German poultry farmer and producer)
- Würth

== Transport ==
Lohne lies on the A1 freeway (European route E 37) between Bremen and Osnabrück. It can be reached via the exit Lohne / Dinklage.

The train station lies on the Delmenhorst–Hesepe railway, which is operated by the NordWestBahn. Trains run every hour as RB 58 to Osnabrück and Bremen. Until 1999, a Lohne-Dinklage narrow-gauge railway was in operation; passenger transport ended in 1954. Meanwhile, most of the tracks have been converted into a bike path. In November 2013, the call bus system "Moobilplus Vechta" was put into operation in the district of Vechta, in which Lohne is involved. Every hour a bus operates between Dinklage, Lohne and the Lohner municipality Märschendorf.

Other buses run, including "Weser-Ems-Buses", for example to Damme and Diepholz.

From the 1920s, there were plans to build a channel called "Hansakanal". It would pass through the middle of Lohne, and would connect the Rhine-Ruhr metropolitan region with the seaports of Bremen and Hamburg. In 1950 the plan was finally abandoned.

The nearest international airports are Bremen Airport (80 km north) and Münster Osnabrück Airport (80 km south).

Lohne has a Tesla Supercharger, a fast-charging station from Tesla.

== Population development ==
Year	1933	1939	1950	1977	1980	1990	2005	2008	2013	2016	2017	2022	2024
Residents	7.611	8.254	11.993	18.211	19.194	20.219	26.053	26.499	27.127	28,157	28,513	27,985	28,089

== Religion ==
=== Denominational Statistics ===
According to the 2011 Census, 67.6% of the population were Roman Catholic, 15.8% were Evangelical, and 16.7% were either non-religious, belonged to other religious communities, or did not specify their affiliation. In early 2022, 55.7% of the residents were Catholic, 13.4% were Evangelical, and 30.9% were non-religious or belonged to other faith communities. In early 2023, 53.7% of the people in Lohne were Catholic, and 13% were Evangelical. Other religions and non-religious individuals together accounted for 33%.

The number of Protestants and Catholics has decreased during the observed period.

=== Catholic Churches ===
Lohne and its districts have the following Catholic churches:

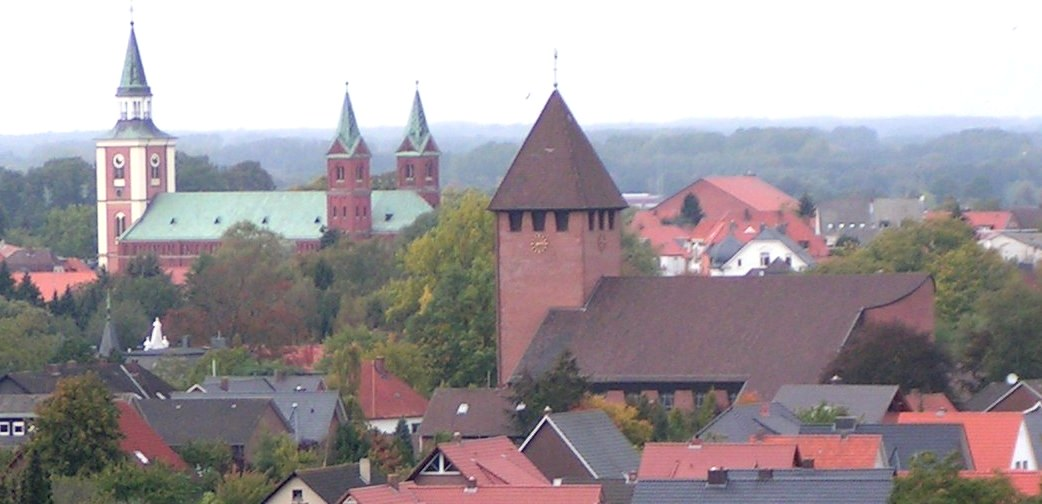
Catholic churches St. Gertrud (left) and St. Josef (right), viewed from the observation tower

- Parish Church St. Gertrud, the namesake of the corresponding church community
- Filial Church St. Josef
- Filial Church St. Maria-Goretti (Brockdorf)
- Pilgrimage and Chapel of Grace St. Anna Klus
- Filial Church Herz Jesu (Kroge/Ehrendorf)
- Chapel Rießel

=== Evangelical Churches ===
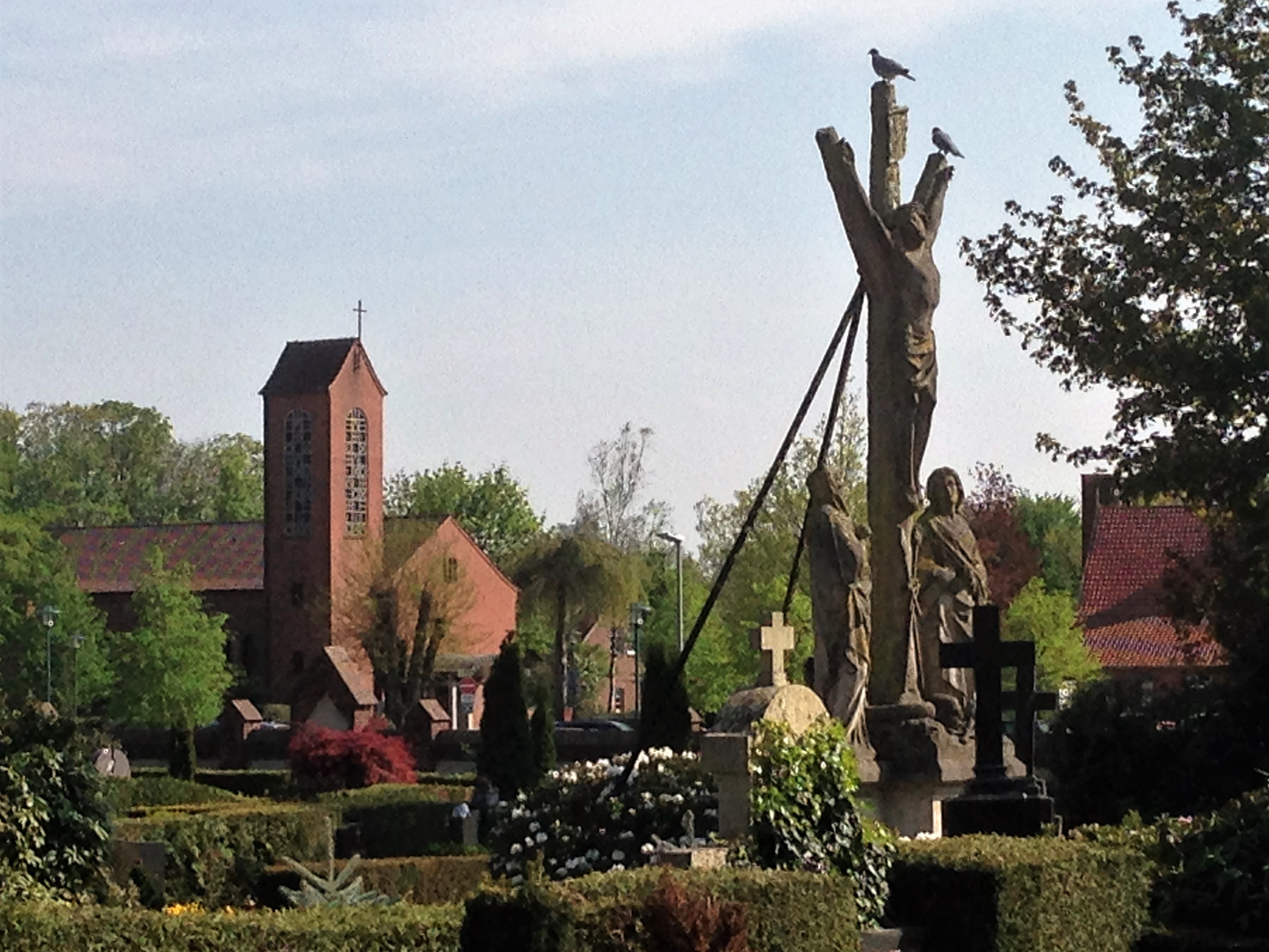
Catholic Cemetery and Evangelical Church St. Michael

- St. Michael's Church, the namesake of the corresponding church community

=== Mosques ===
- Mosque Bilal-i Habeşi Camii

== Culture and sights ==
=== Theatre ===
- Freilichtbühne Lohne
- Musical AG of the Lohner high school
- Theatregroup of the Schützenverein Bokern-Märschendorf
- Theaterring Lohne e. V.

=== Notable places ===
- Lohne Museum of Industry (opened in March 2000)
- St.-Gertrud-Church with impressive high altar
- St.-Anna-Klus (pilgrimage church) with healing spring
- "Patoratsmühle" (historical water mill at the city park)
- Windmill „Elbers Mühle“
- Outlook tower at the forest park
- Moated castle Hopen
- Urban Villas (Villa Clodius, Villa Taphorn, Villa Trenkamp, Villa Trenkamp and Bohmann, Haus Uptmoor)
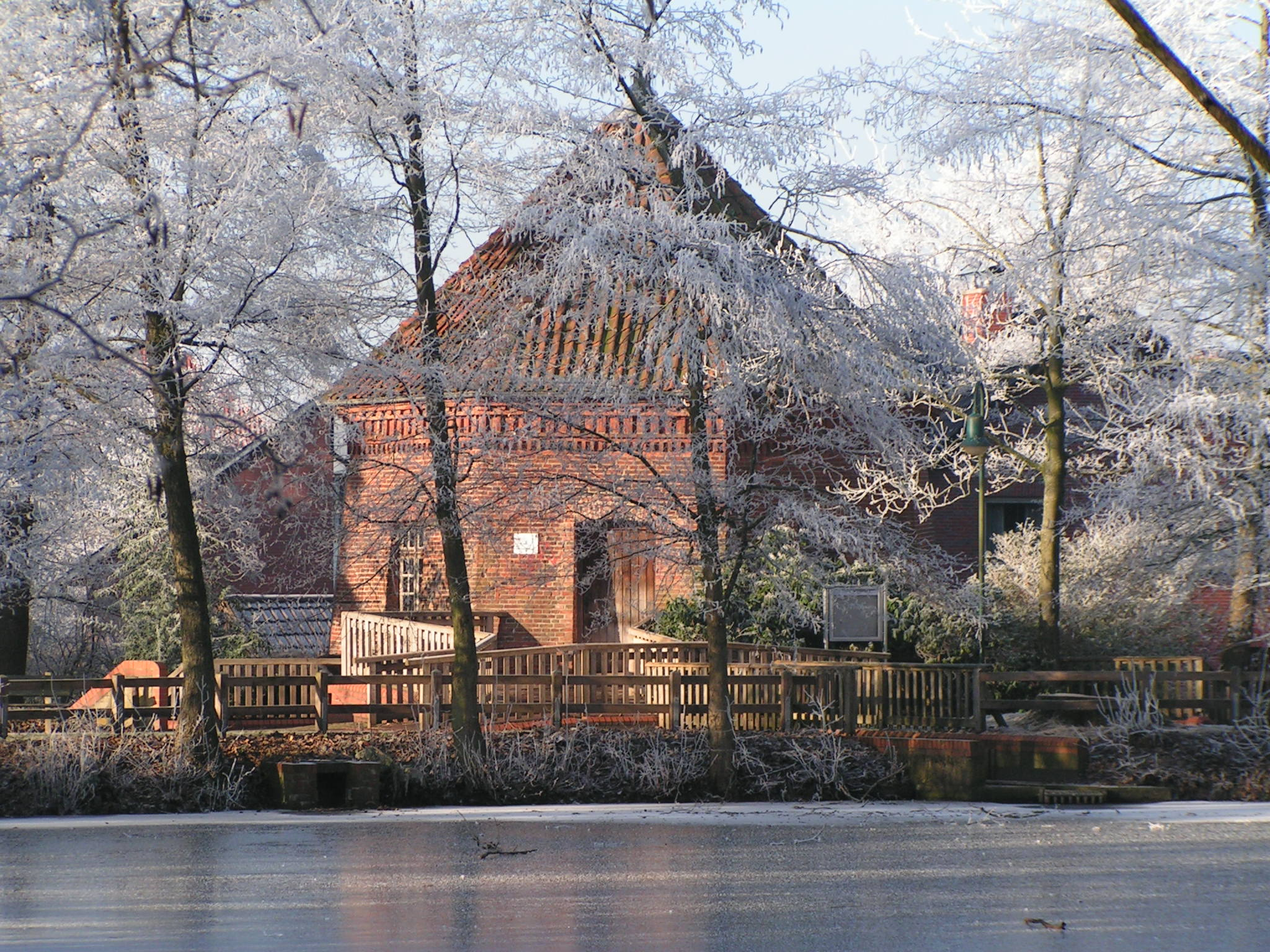
Watermill at the city park

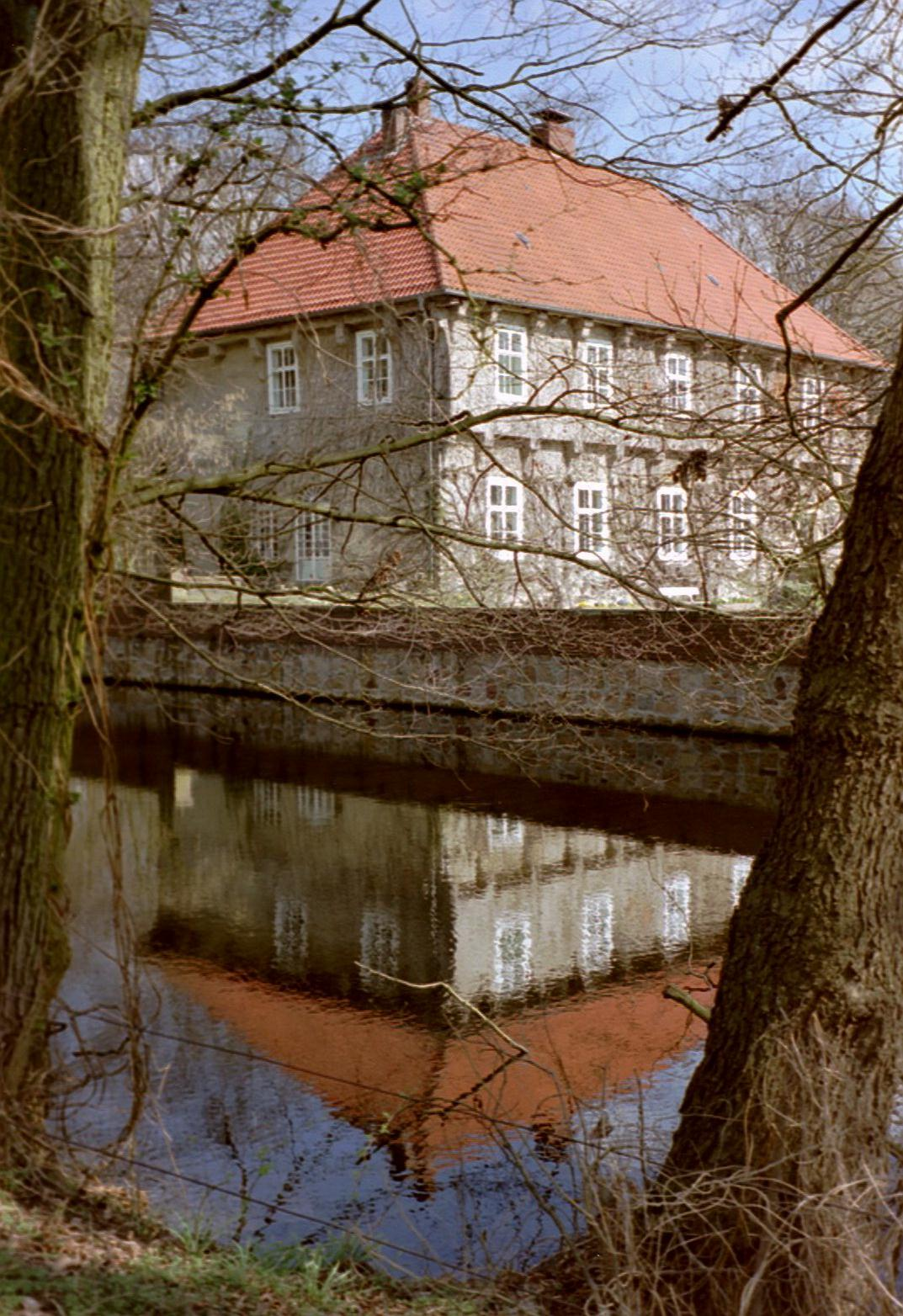
Moated castle "Burg Hopen"

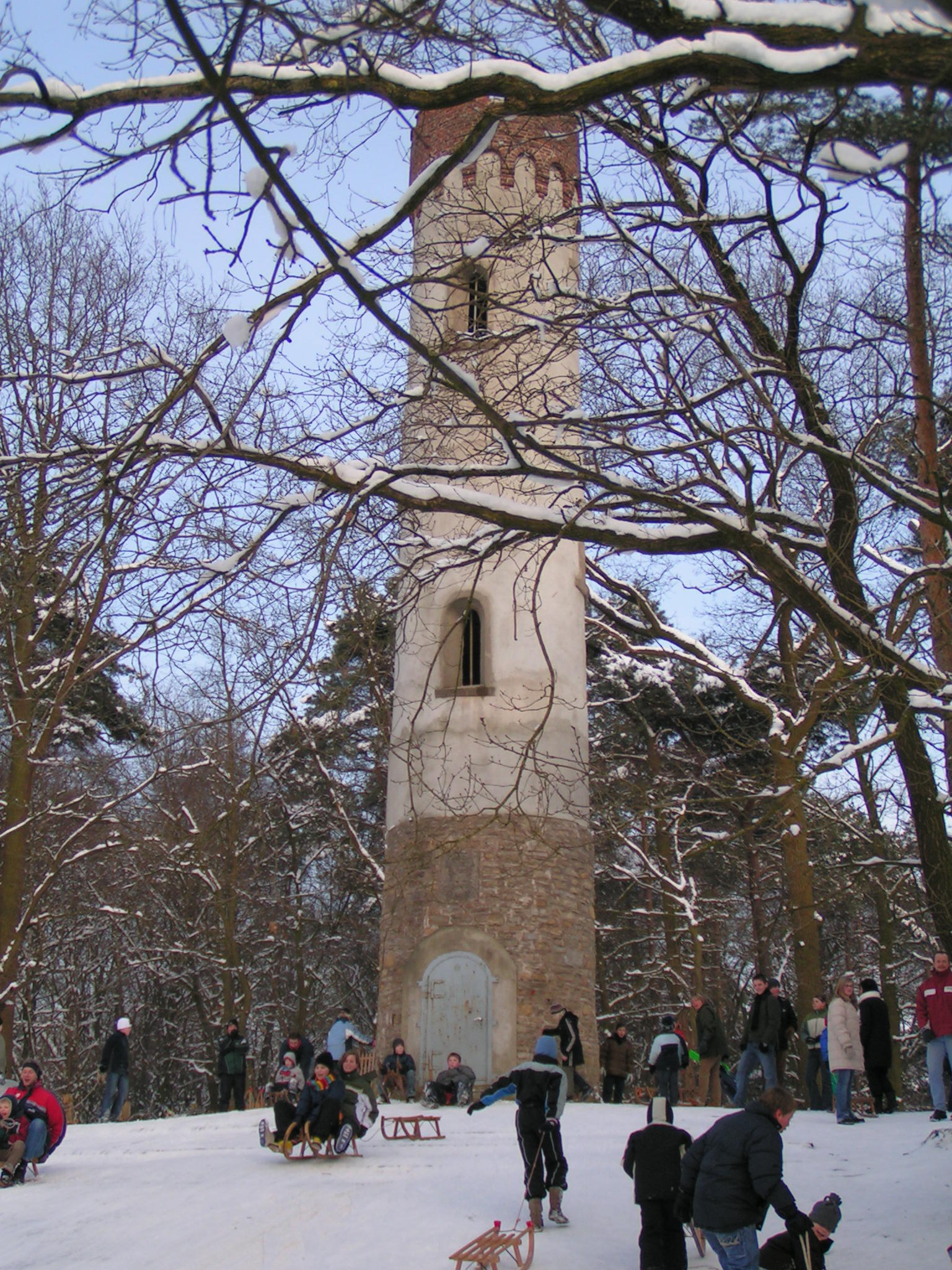
Outlook tower at the forest park

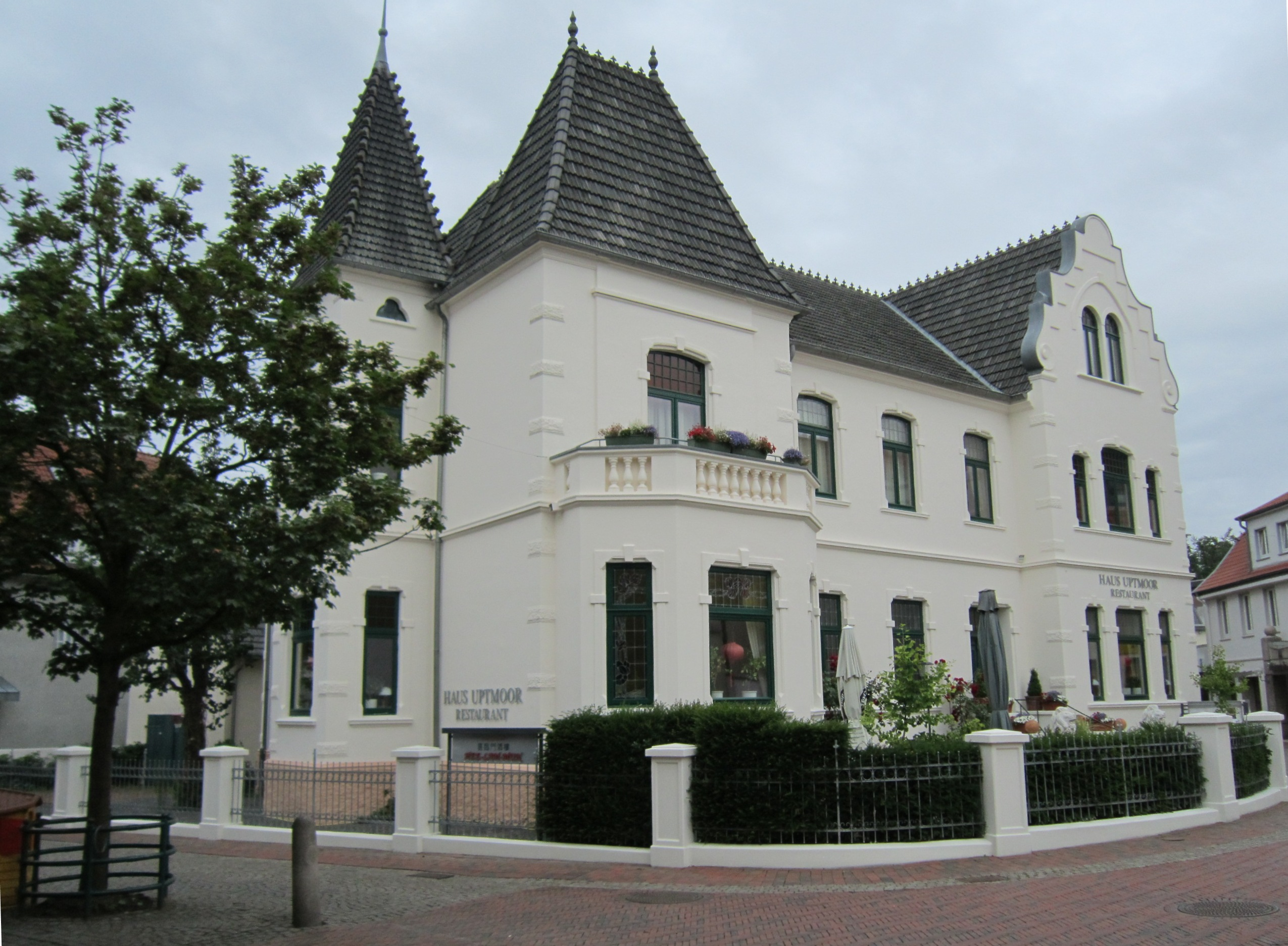
House Uptmoor

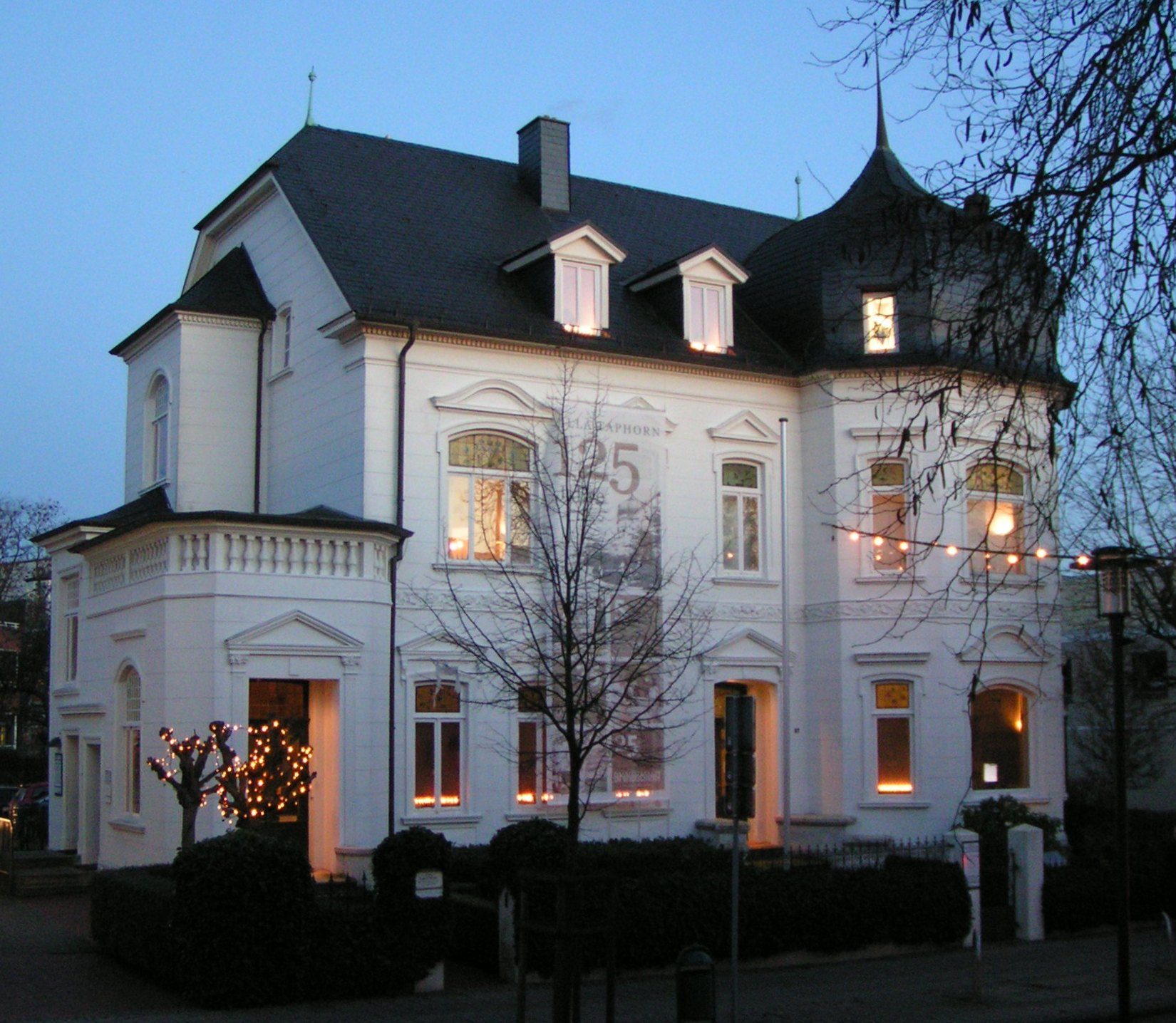
Villa Taphorn

=== Outdoor artwork ===
- Bronze sculpture „Gänseliesel“ (Hans-Gerd Ruwe, 1978)
- Bronze sculpture „Begegnung“ (Holger Voigts, 1986)
- Fountain sculpture „EGOLOHNE 88“ (Jürgen Goertz, 1988)
- Bronze sculpture „Mantelmadonna“ (Judith von Eßen, 1991)
- Acacia wood sculpture „Gestern – Heute – Morgen“ (Jacques Muhlenbach, 1992)
- Dimension stone sculpture „Zwei Stühle-Thron“ (Rudolf Kaiser, 1992)
- Diabase sculpture „Lohner Wasserstein“ (Wolf Bröll, 1992)
- Bronze fountain sculpture „Das tapfere Schneiderlein“ (Bernhard Kleinhans, 1992)
- Clay sculpture „Befreite Formen“ and marble sculpture „Magisches Quadrat“ (Wolfgang Roßdeutscher, 1992 and 1993)
- Bronze sculpture „Disput“ (Bernd Altenstein, 2009)
- Steel sculpture „Jede Menge Leute“ (Werner Berges, 2012)
- Steel sculpture at the „Lohneum“ (Alfred Bullermann, 2018)
- other sculptures throughout the city

1992 Lohne organized a Sculptor symposium. Many sculptures in Lohne are the result of it.

In the area of the town are more than 100 Wayside crosses.

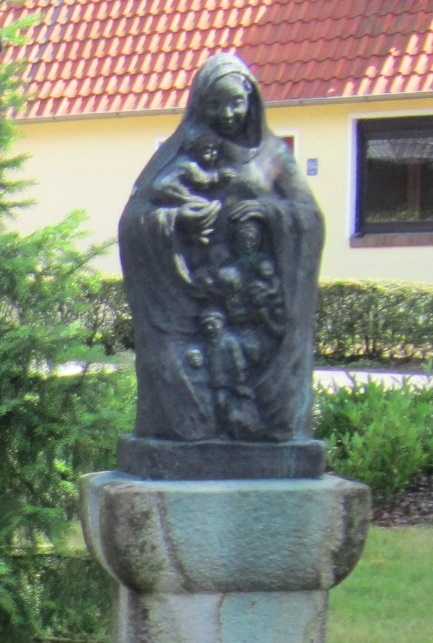
Bronze sculpture „Mantelmadonna“ (Judith von Eßen, 1991)

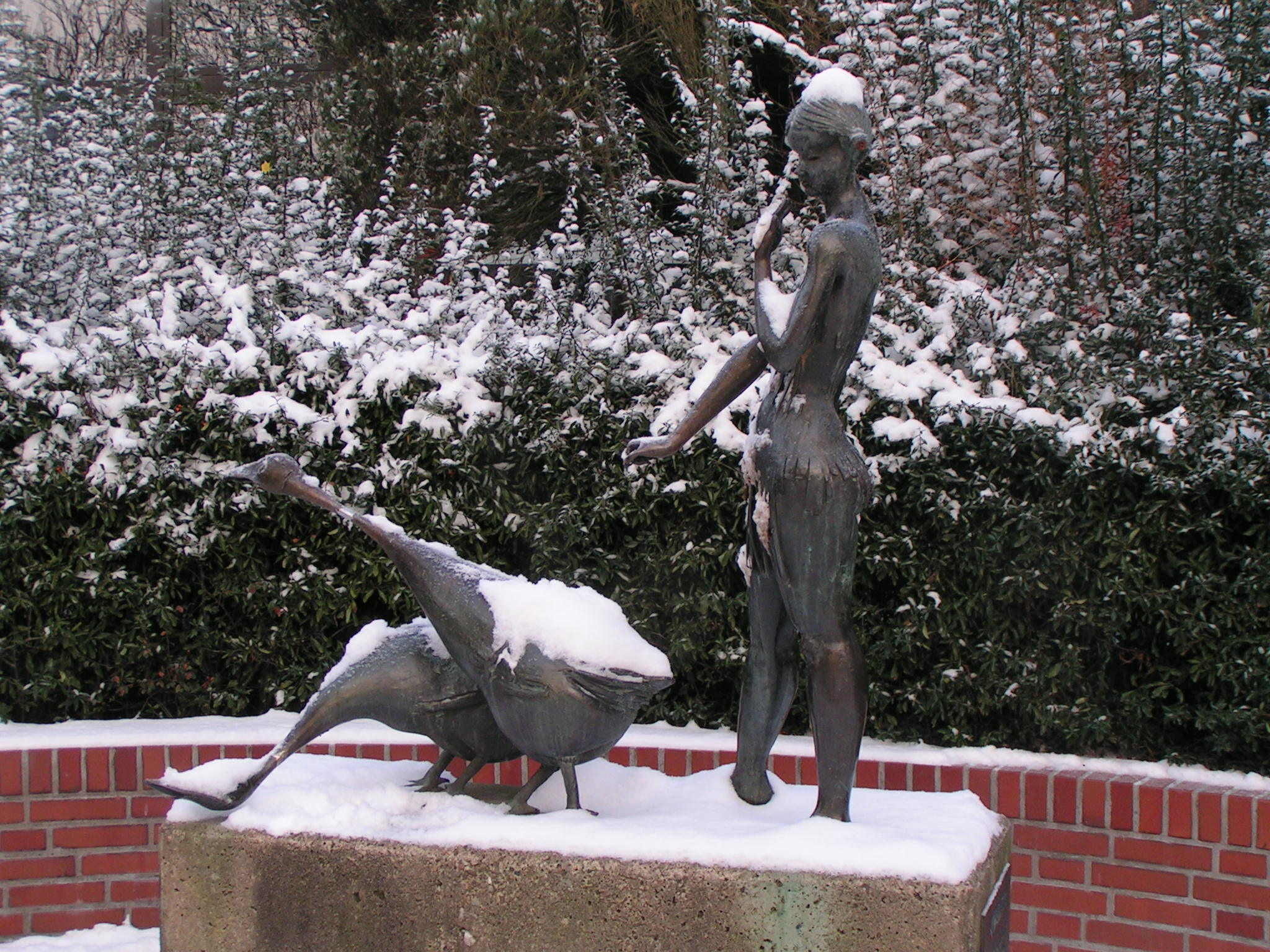
Bronze sculpture „Gänseliesel“ (Hans-Gerd Ruwe, 1978)

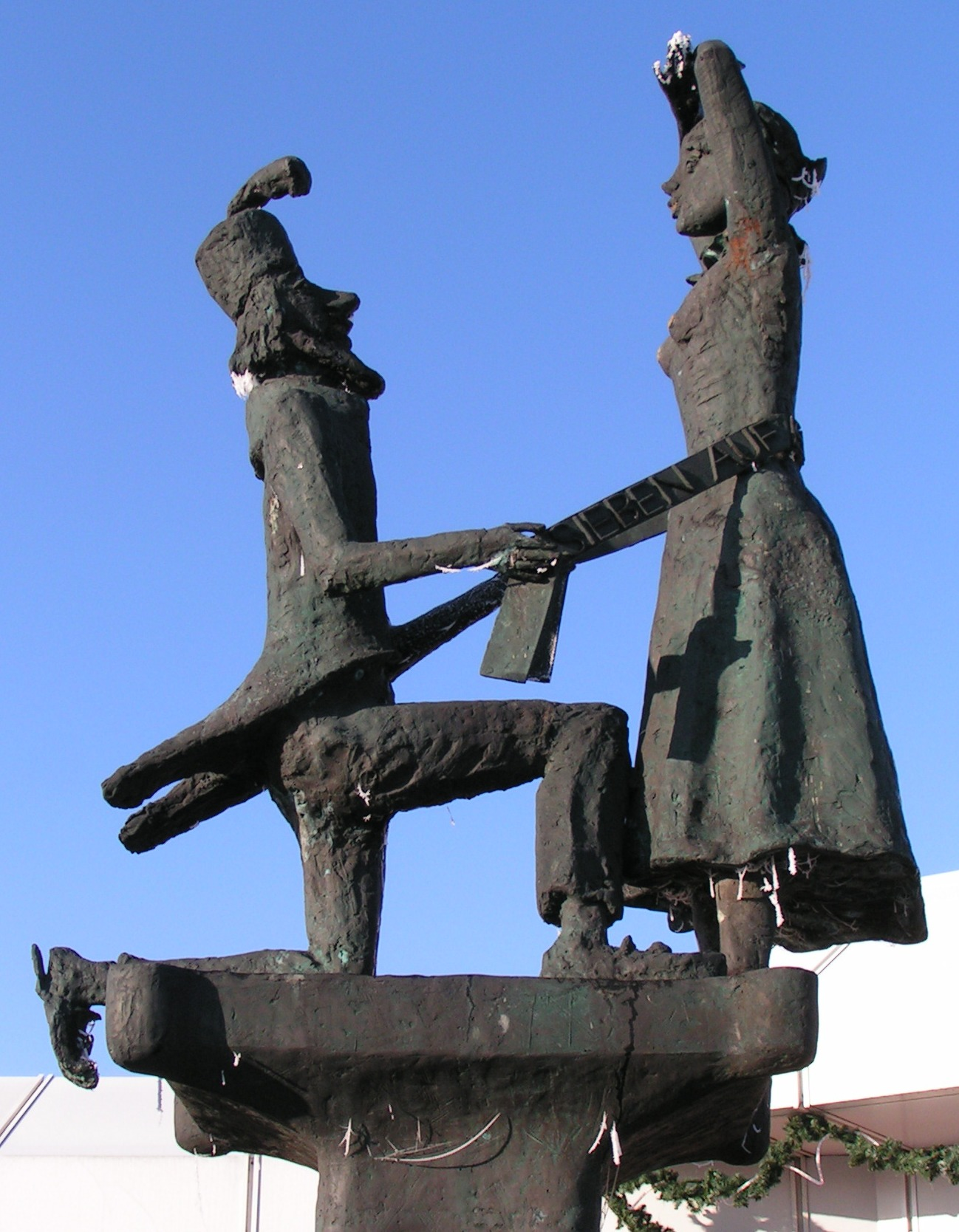
Bronze fountain sculpture „Das tapfere Schneiderlein“ (Bernhard Kleinhans, 1992)

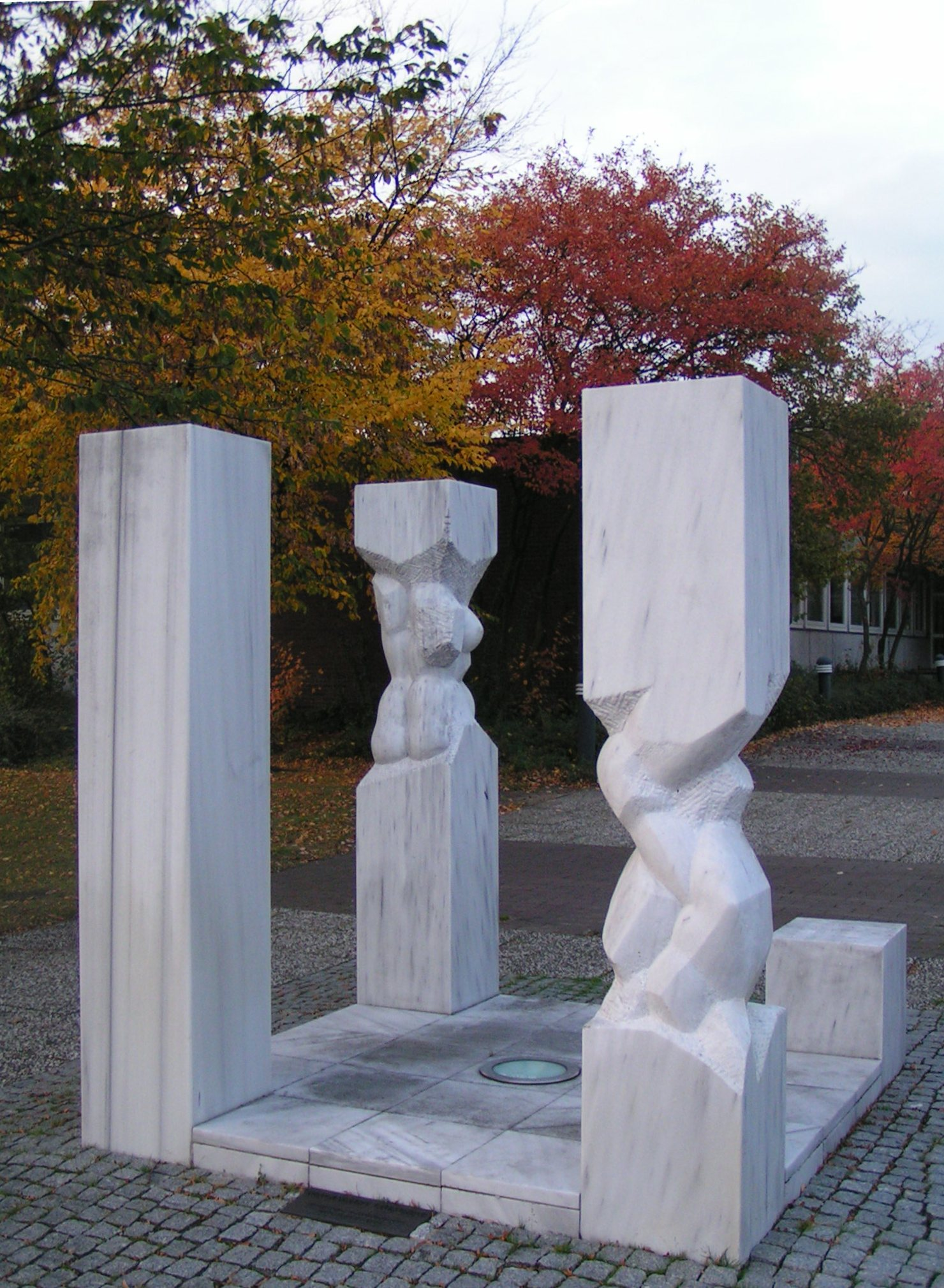
Marble sculpture „Magisches Quadrat“ (Wolfgang Roßdeutscher, 1993)

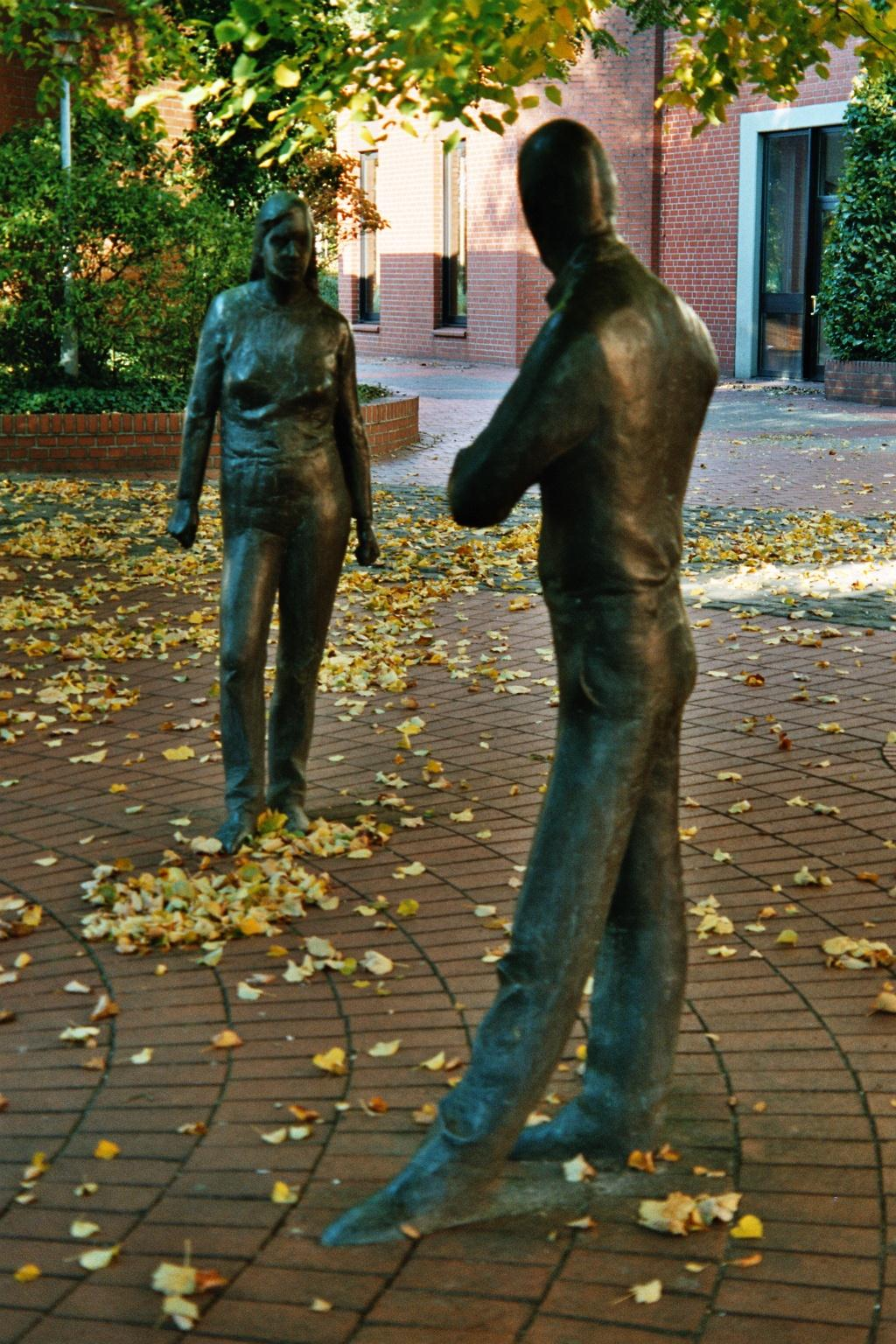
Bronze sculpture „Begegnung“ (Holger Voigts, 1986)

== Notable people ==
- Claus Peter Poppe (born 1948), politician (SPD), member of Lower Saxony Landtag 2003–2014
- Johannes Schmoelling (born 1950), musician
- Benno Möhlmann (born 1954), football player and manager
- Ulrich Kirchhoff (born 1967), show jumper, Olympic champion
- Erik Pfeifer (born 1987), boxer, German champion
- Vivien Endemann (born 2001), German footballer

=== Honorary citizens ===
Honorary citizenship is the highest honour Lohne has to offer. Only three citizens have received this award:

- Helmut Göttke-Krogmann (1919–2008), former voluntary mayor (1972–1991)
- Hans Diekmann (born 1938), former voluntary mayor (1991–2001)
- Hans-Georg Niesel (born 1944), former town director (1979–2001) and full-time mayor (2001–2011)

== Politics ==
=== City council ===
CDU	19 seats
SPD	7 seats
Wählergruppe Unabhängige Bürgergemeinschaft (UBG)	4 seat
Bündnis 90/Die Grünen	2 seat
Wählergruppe Pro Wald für Natur- und Klimaschutz (Pro Wald)	2 seat

(as of 12 September 2021)

By German law, cities between 25,001 and 30,000 citizens must have 36 councillors (German Stadträte), Lohne has only 34. The party AFD won 1 seat for council, but the candidate declined to take up the seat and there was no replacement candidate to fill the vancancy. The UBG has won 4 seats but only had 4 candidates on their ticket. The legislative period is 5 years.

=== Mayor ===
In 2022, Henriette Veet was elected as mayor (CDU). The previous mayor Tobias Gerdesmeyer was elected as Landrat for the district of Vechta.

=== Coat of arms ===
On 3 January 1912, the grand duke of Oldenburg granted the coat of arms. The shield is divided into four quarters (party per quarterly). The upper left quarter shows gold and red fesses, the lower right quarter shows a golden cross on blue ground. They are the same as in the coat of arms of the grand duke. The upper right quarter shows a church on white ground. It displays the modest character of Lohne in union with the Catholic Church. The lower left square shows a wing on a crown. The crown is symbolic of wage and price of the bourgeois activity (Lohn und Preis der bürgerlichen Regsamkeit). The wing is symbolic of the significant feather industry in Lohne in the early 19th century.
