= Eydelstedt =

- Municipality
- Location of Eydelstedt within Diepholz district
- Interactive map of Eydelstedt
- Location within Germany Location within Lower Saxony
- Coordinates: 52°42′N 08°33′E
- Country: Germany
- State: Lower Saxony
- District: Diepholz
- Municipal assoc.: Barnstorf
- Subdivisions: 5 Ortsteile

Government
  - Mayor: Cord-Hinrich Egelriede (CDU)

Area
  - Total: 76.23 km^{2} (29.43 sq mi)
- Elevation: 35 m (115 ft)

Population (2025-12-31)
  - Total: 1,782
  - Density: 23.38/km^{2} (60.55/sq mi)
- Time zone: UTC+01:00 (CET)
  - Summer (DST): UTC+02:00 (CEST)
- Postal codes: 49406
- Dialling codes: 05442
- Vehicle registration: DH
- Website: www.eydelstedt.de

Eydelstedt (German pronunciation: [ˈaɪdl̩ʃtɛt]; Low German: Eidelstee) is a municipality in the district of Diepholz, in Lower Saxony, Germany.

== People ==
- Christian Hülsmeyer (1881-1957), German inventor, physicist and entrepreneur
