= Christian Hülsmeyer =

German inventor, physicist and entrepreneur (1881–1957)

- Born: 25 December 1881; Eydelstedt, German Empire
- Died: 31 January 1957 (aged 75); Ahrweiler, West Germany
- Resting place: Düsseldorf
- Other names: Christian Huelsmeyer
- Education: Bremen Lehrerseminare
- Known for: Telemobiloscope, radar
- Scientific career
- Fields: Applied physics, electrical engineering
- Institutions: Siemens & Halske

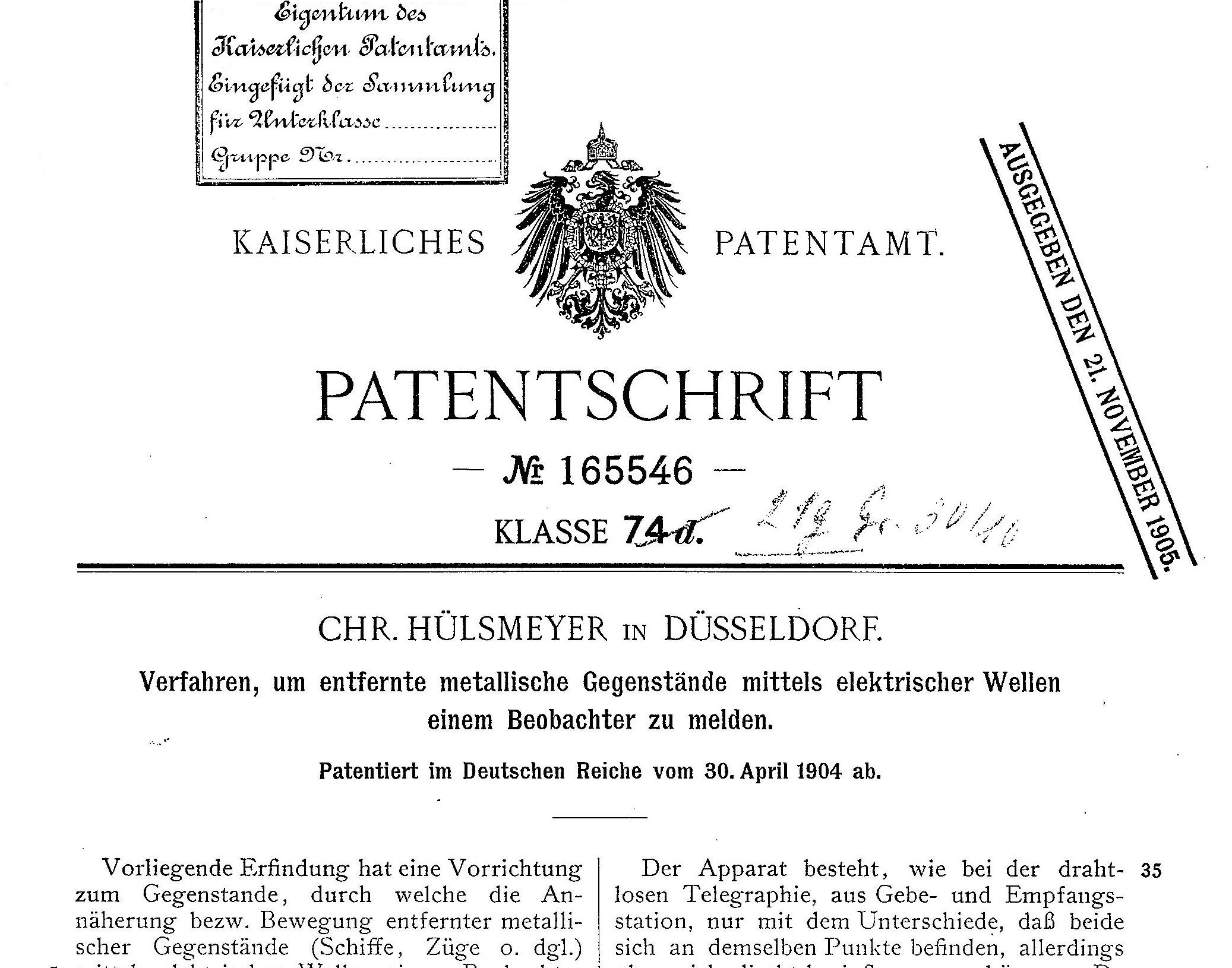
German patent specification of Hülsmeyers Telemobiloskop

Christian Hülsmeyer (Huelsmeyer) (25 December 1881 – 31 January 1957) was a German inventor, physicist and entrepreneur. He is credited with the invention of radar, although his apparatus, called the "Telemobiloscope," could not directly measure distance to a target. The Telemobiloscope was, however, the first patented device using radio waves for detecting the presence of distant objects like ships.

== Background ==
Hülsmeyer was born at Eydelstedt, a village in Lower Saxony, Germany. He was the youngest of five children of Johann Heinrich Ernst Meyer and Elisabeth Wilhelmine Brenning. His birth name was Johann Christel, but after early childhood the name Christian was used. Following completion of the local Volksschule (elementary school), he attended Grundschule (primary school) in nearby Donstorf. A teacher there recognized his capabilities and, in 1896, assisted him in gaining admission to the Lehrerseminare (Teacher Training College) in Bremen. At the school, his major interest was in physics, and, after classroom hours, he was allowed to use the physics laboratory for his own experimenting. His interest was more with the potential applications of physics than with the academic side.

In June 1900, Hülsmeyer left college without completing his studies and obtained a job as an electrical trainee in the Siemens & Halske factory in Bremen. There he learned how concepts of devices were turned into commercial applications, intensifying his inventive nature. In April 1902, he left employment with Siemens to live with his brother Wilhelm in Düsseldorf and pursue his ideas for electrical and optical products. His brother initially funded him in setting up a shop where, a number of ideas were quickly turned into working items. These included a device (called a Telephonogram) that telegraphed sounds; an electro-optical system for turning a truck into a mobile, multi-faced billboard; and a wireless apparatus for remotely igniting explosives. Within a year, he filed several patent applications on these and other inventions.

== The Telemobiloscope ==
In developing the wireless apparatus, Hülsmeyer read of Heinrich Hertz's discovery that electromagnetic waves were reflected from metallic surfaces. He then turned his full attention to using the Hertz phenomenon in a system for preventing collisions between ships. Giving the name Telemobiloskop (Telemobiloscope) to the system, he made a patent application on 21 November 1903, and also advertised for a financial backer. Henry Mannheim, a leather merchant in Cologne, responded, and in March 1904, invested 2,000 Marks for 20 percent of future profits from the apparatus. The firm Telemobiloskop–Gesellschaft Hülsmeyer & Mannheim was opened the following May and officially registered in Cologne on 7 July 1904.

Hülsmeyer's initial patent application for the Telemobiloscope was rejected, but a refiling, dated 30 April 1904, was accepted, resulting in Patent Publication DE 165546. An article on the system was published in a British technical magazine.

The Telemobiloscope was primarily a spark-gap transmitter connected to an array of dipole antennas, and a coherer receiver with a cylindrical parabolic antenna that could rotate 360 degrees. While the transmitted signal had a broad coverage, the receiving antenna was narrowly focused. When a reflected signal reached the receiver, a relay was actuated and, in turn, rang an electric bell. The basic patent description is as follows: Hertzian-wave Projecting and Receiving Apparatus Adapted to Indicate or Give Warning of the Presence of a Metallic Body, such as Ships or Train, in the Line of Projecting of such Waves.

The system included a mechanism synchronizing the aiming direction of the receiving antenna with a compass-like indicator; it also included a means of rejecting false signals. Although the Telemobiloscope could not directly indicate range, a separate patent (DE 169154) was granted 2 April 1906, showing a method of using two vertical measurements and trigonometry to calculate approximate range. A relatively detailed description of the Telemobiloscope system, including a copy of the patent, is contained in a paper by Bauer.

The first public demonstration of the Telemobiloscope was in the courtyard of the Dom Hotel in Cologne on 17 May 1904. The metal gate to the courtyard was the target, and the transmission path was through a curtain – showing that the apparatus could work when the target could not be seen. The demonstration was reported widely in newspapers, one giving a detailed description.

A conference was held in June 1904, at Scheveningen, the Netherlands, involving the major shipping firms of the region; ship safety was a major topic. After learning of the demonstration at the Dom Hotel, the head of the Holland-Amerika Lijn (HAL) invited Telemobiloskop-Gesellschaft to provide a demonstration of their apparatus during the conference. This demonstration took place on 9 June during a tour through the harbor at Rotterdam aboard the ship-tender Columbus. The Minutes of the conference (contained in the HAL Archives in the Municipal Archives of Rotterdam) include the following description of the demonstration:

The trial on board of the Columbus, though on very limited scale and with an unfinished apparatus, proved that the principle of the inventor is correct. Every time when, even at certain distance, a vessel passed, the apparatus operated immediately.

Newspapers carried articles about the demonstration, all giving praise to the new maritime safety invention. One of these closed the article with the following: "Because, above and under water metal objects reflect waves, this invention might have significance for future warfare."

The building of the Telemobiloscope and its demonstrations had depleted the initial funds of the Telemobiloskop–Gesellschaft firm. On 12 August 1904, rights to the system were sold to Trading Company Z.H. Gumpel daselbst of Hannover. The sales agreement, to which Heinrich Mannheim was a signer, said that Hülsmeyer would be given up to 5,000 Marks for future research, and 45 percent of net profits from future sales. It noted that the previous agreement with Mannheim was then obsolete, and after Hülsmeyer has provided proof of the usefulness of his invention, the Gumpel Company would establish a Consortium to commercialize the invention. It also noted that If the Telemobiloscope rights were in turn sold by Gumpel, the sales price would have to exceed 1,000,000 Marks.

Improvements were made on the equipment, particularly in extending the operational distance. Patent applications on the Telemobiloscope were filed in a number of countries. The application in Great Britain was granted in only 10 weeks, but most of the others were either withdrawn, rejected, or not processed because fees were not paid.

A request was made to Holland-America to allow a demonstration at sea; this was apparently turned down but another demonstration was given near the Hook of Holland in the autumn of 1904. A second conference of the shipping firms was held in London in June 1905; the Conference Minutes include the following:

The Telemobiloscope: A new trial at the Hook of Holland had been a failure. One of the delegates reported also that the principle on which the apparatus is based has been proven to be in error, so that probably nothing more will be heard of it.

With the distribution of these Minutes in the European shipping community, the prospect of the Telemobiloscope as a viable product ended. There have been many explanations as to the failure; these mainly cite either poor equipment design or the competition of Marconi. The Telemobiloscope design used wireless technology of the late 1890s, and did not include tuning circuits for frequency selection. By 1904, there were many wireless sets aboard ships and at shore stations, and, without tuning capability, these could not be rejected and thus interfered with the Telemobiloscope operation. As to competition, Marconi's Wireless Telegraph Company dominated Europe and had agreements with essentially all shipping firms prohibiting their use of anything except Marconi equipment.

The Official Registry in Cologne shows that the Telemobiloskop–Gesellschaft Hülsmeyer & Mannheim firm was dissolved 5 October 1905. Also, the agreement with Gumpel to establish a Consortium for commercializing the invention would no longer be applicable.

== Post-Telemobiloscope activities ==
In 1904, while still heavily engaged with the Telemobiloscope, Hülsmeyer filed for a patent (DE180009) on a machine for diameter reduction of metallic rods and tubes, and in 1906, established a firm supplying equipment for producing incandescent lamps. This was followed in 1907 by his forming the company Kessel-und Apparatebau Christian Hülsmeyer (Boilers and Apparatus Construction) in Düsseldorf; in 1910, he bought a factory site at Düsseldorf-Flingern for the firm. For many years, this company built steam and water apparatus, high-pressure gauges, and anti-rust-filters (trade named "Rostex"). The company continued to operate until 1953. Altogether in his career, Hülsmeyer developed and patented some 180 inventions; these and his various businesses ultimately brought him financial success.

Although there is controversy about his inventing radar, Christian Hülsmeyer is still held in high esteem in Germany. In January 1982, Professor K. Mauel gave a lecture at the Organization of German Engineers Center in Düsseldorf on Radar History, celebrating the centenary of Hülsmeyer's birth. At the 2002 EUSAR Conference in Cologne, the keynote speech was "Hülsmeyer – The Inventor of Radar."

During a radar conference held in Frankfurt in 1953, Hülsmeyer and Robert Watson-Watt were honored guests. (Watson-Watt had been a leader of radar technology development in Great Britain, and received a patent on the system in 1935). In a discussion with Hülsmeyer as to who was the rightful inventor of this technology, it is said that Watson-Watt ended the discussion by remarking, "I am the father of radar, whereas you are its grandfather."

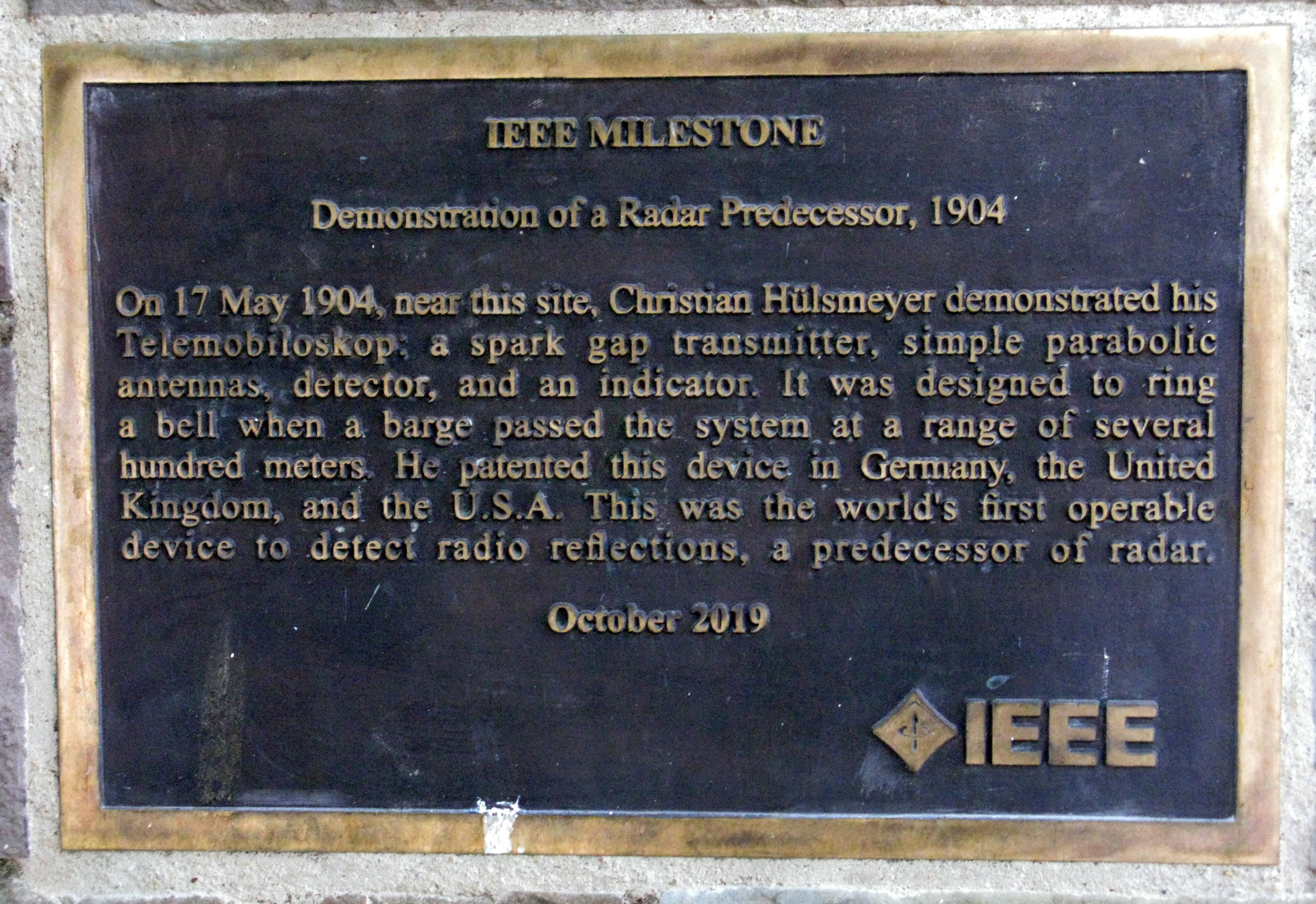
commemorative plaque in Cologne

On 29 October 1910, Christian Hülsmeyer married Luise Petersen of Bremen. Between 1911 and 1924, they had six children. One of these, a daughter named Annelise Hülsmeyer-Hecker, maintained collection of documents related to her father, and was a source of much that has been written concerning him. She was also instrumental in collecting items, including components of the Telemobiloscope, that are now displayed in the Deutsches Museum. Upon his death in Ahrweiler on 31 Jan. 1957, Christian Hülsmeyer was buried in the North Cemetery at Düsseldorf.

On 19 October 2019, 115 years after the demonstration of his Telemobiloscope at Cologne the Institute of Electrical and Electronics Engineers honored Hülsmeyer with two commemorative plaques, in English and German, in the Rheingarten of Cologne. Descendents of Hülsmeyer and the eldest grandson of the first Federal Chancellor Konrad Adenauer had been the honored guests.

== Other references ==
- Hollmann, Martin. "Christian Huelsmeyer, the inventor". Radar World.
- Kern, Ulrich (1984). Die Entstehung des Radarverfahrens: Zur Geschichte der Radartechnik bis 1945 [The Origin of the Radar Procedure: Also the History of the Radar Technology to 1945] (Ph.D. thesis) (in German). University of Stuttgart. OCLC 923439776.
- Watson, Raymond C. Jr. (2009). Radar Origins Worldwide: History of Its Evolution in 13 Nations Through World War II. Trafford Publishing. ISBN 978-1-4269-2111-7. OCLC 893672384.
