= Wagenfeld =

- Municipality
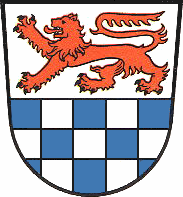
- Coat of arms

- Location of Wagenfeld within Diepholz district
- Interactive map of Wagenfeld
- Location within Germany Location within Lower Saxony
- Coordinates: 52°32′N 8°34′E
- Country: Germany
- State: Lower Saxony
- District: Diepholz

Government
  - Mayor (2021–26): Matthias Kreye

Area
  - Total: 117.57 km^{2} (45.39 sq mi)
- Elevation: 40 m (130 ft)

Population (2025-12-31)
  - Total: 6,987
  - Density: 59.43/km^{2} (153.9/sq mi)
- Time zone: UTC+01:00 (CET)
  - Summer (DST): UTC+02:00 (CEST)
- Postal codes: 49419
- Dialling codes: 0 54 44
- Vehicle registration: DH
- Website: www.wagenfeld.de

Wagenfeld (German pronunciation: [ˈvaːɡn̩ˌfɛlt]) is a municipality in the district of Diepholz, Lower Saxony, Germany. It is situated approximately 15 km east of Diepholz, and 40 km northwest of Minden.
