= Barnstorf (Samtgemeinde) =

- Samtgemeinde
- Coat of arms
- Interactive map of Barnstorf
- Location within Germany Location within Lower Saxony
- Coordinates: 52°42′36″N 08°30′23″E
- Country: Germany
- State: Lower Saxony
- District: Diepholz
- Subdivisions: 4 municipalities

Government
  - Mayor (2021–26): Alexander Grimm (SPD)

Area
  - Total: 205.76 km^{2} (79.44 sq mi)
- Elevation: 31 m (102 ft)

Population (2025-12-31)
  - Total: 12,489
  - Density: 60.697/km^{2} (157.20/sq mi)
- Time zone: UTC+01:00 (CET)
  - Summer (DST): UTC+02:00 (CEST)
- Postal codes: 49406
- Dialling codes: 05442
- Vehicle registration: DH
- Website: www.barnstorf.de

Barnstorf is a Samtgemeinde ("collective municipality") in the district of Diepholz, in Lower Saxony, Germany. Its seat is in the village Barnstorf.

The Samtgemeinde Barnstorf consists of the following municipalities:

1. Barnstorf
2. Drebber
3. Drentwede
4. Eydelstedt
