= Drebber =

- Municipality
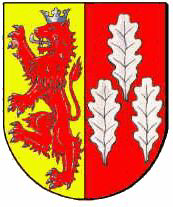
- Coat of arms

- Location of Drebber within Diepholz district
- Interactive map of Drebber
- Location within Germany Location within Lower Saxony
- Coordinates: 52°39′N 08°26′E
- Country: Germany
- State: Lower Saxony
- District: Diepholz
- Municipal assoc.: Barnstorf

Government
  - Mayor: Friedrich Iven (SPD)

Area
  - Total: 47.16 km^{2} (18.21 sq mi)
- Elevation: 32–45 m (105–148 ft)

Population (2025-12-31)
  - Total: 2,942
  - Density: 62.38/km^{2} (161.6/sq mi)
- Time zone: UTC+01:00 (CET)
  - Summer (DST): UTC+02:00 (CEST)
- Postal codes: 49457
- Dialling codes: 05445
- Vehicle registration: DH

Drebber (German pronunciation: [ˈdʁɛbɐ]) is a municipality in the district of Diepholz, in Lower Saxony, Germany.

== See also ==
- Rehden Geest Moor, a local nature reserve
- Großes Moor, a large bogland area
