= Barnstorf =

- Municipality
- Coat of arms

- Location of Barnstorf within Diepholz district
- Interactive map of Barnstorf
- Location within Germany Location within Lower Saxony
- Coordinates: 52°42′37″N 08°30′31″E
- Country: Germany
- State: Lower Saxony
- District: Diepholz
- Municipal assoc.: Barnstorf
- Subdivisions: 4 Ortsteile

Government
  - Mayor: Peter Luther (CDU)

Area
  - Total: 52.36 km^{2} (20.22 sq mi)
- Elevation: 29 m (95 ft)

Population (2025-12-31)
  - Total: 6,757
  - Density: 129.0/km^{2} (334.2/sq mi)
- Time zone: UTC+01:00 (CET)
  - Summer (DST): UTC+02:00 (CEST)
- Postal codes: 49406
- Dialling codes: 05442
- Vehicle registration: DH
- Website: www.barnstorf.de

Barnstorf (German pronunciation: [ˈbaʁnstɔʁf]; Low German: Baarnstrup) is a municipality in the district of Diepholz, in Lower Saxony, Germany. It is situated approximately 15 km northeast of Diepholz.

Barnstorf is home to the football club Barnstorfer SV.

Barnstorf is also the seat of the Samtgemeinde ("collective municipality") Barnstorf.
