= Hahndreier =

Danish-German card game

- Origin: Denmark or Germany
- Alternative names: See text
- Type: Shedding game
- Players: 2–4
- Age range: 6+
- Cards: 36
- Deck: French-suited
- Rank (high→low): A K Q J 10 9 8 7 6
- Play: Clockwise

Hahndreier or Hanrei is an 18th-century Danish and north German children's and family round game played with cards that is still played in some forms today.

== Name ==
The game is recorded under numerous different spellings in the literature including: Hahndrei, Hahndrei um’n lüchter, Hahndreier um’n lüchter, Hahndreier, Hahndreih, Hahndreiher, Hahnendreher um Schluck, Hahnenrei, Hahnrei, Hahnrei mit Naklapp, Hahnrei-Racker, Hahnrei un Racker, Hahnrei up'n Barg, Hahnrei verdeckt, Hahnreier, Hohn, Hohnendreier um Sluk, Hohnendreier um een Schluch. Variants include bedregn, bedregen or bedreegten Hahnrei, neIi Hahn, Nieschierei and verdeckten Hahnrei. Another name is Racker.

== History ==
As Hahnrey, it appears in a list of games embedded in a poem by Johann Christian Trömer in 1755. In 1795 it was clearly well known in Livonia and Estonia, being equated by Hupel to the Russian game of Durak. (Note: Although the known rules of the two games are quite different.)

In the 19th century, it was found all across northern Germany. For example, on long winter evenings in the Holstein village of Hardebek around 1800, it was one of the most popular card games alongside others such as Solo, Sixty-Six, Brusbart, Black Peter and Hartenlena. In the 1840s it was one of the most popular games in Stralsund. In Grimm's 1877 dictionary it is described as played in Mecklenburg, Pomerania and im Göttingischen (Göttingen area), and was known in Denmark as Hanrei. And in the early 20th century it was still being played in Dithmarschen and Stapelholm on the North Sea coast of Holstein and in the post-war years Christa Bohlmann from Holsten recalls playing Hohnendreier um een Schluck with her grandparents.

Today there is evidence that it is still played in one or two places, such as Wachendorf (Syke), just over the Schleswig-Holstein border in Lower Saxony under the name of Hohnendreier um Sluk or Hohnendreier um’n Sluck ("Hahrei for a Tot"), the loser getting to drink a tot of schnaps.

The earliest rules appear in Jørgensen's Danish games book in 1802 under the name Hanrey. This was reprinted in 1829. In 1847, Martin Schwartz records Hanrei along with its variants.1847. German descriptions do not appear until the early 20th century and are invariably incomplete.

== Danish Hanrey ==
The standard game is called Single or Simple Hanrey. In addition, two variants are described: Double or Long Hanrey and Bunker Hanrey. Jørgensen (1802, 1829) describes the first two; Schwartz (1849) covers the third and spells it Hanrei. The following is a summary of their rules.

=== Single Hanrey ===
Single Hanrey is best played by two to four players using 36 French-suited cards from the Ace to the Six. The pack is well shuffled, but not cut. The dealer deals 3 cards each and turns the next for trump. The remaining cards are stacked, face down, as the stock.

If two play, the non-dealer leads any card to the first trick. If the dealer cannot beat it either with a trump or a higher card of the led suit, he or she must pick it up, and the non-dealer keeps leading until beaten. As long as there are cards left in the stock, players with fewer than 3 cards replenish their hands, the player who took the trick drawing first, and then the opponent, and so it continues until no more cards are left in the stock.

If three or four play, forehand (or first hand), the one who was dealt a card first, leads. second hand must beat the led card if able, otherwise must pick it up. If the card can be beaten, third hand must beat the previous card and so on. A player who cannot beat the last card in the trick, picks it up and the preceding player keeps leading cards until one is beaten.

The player who is last to be left with a card in hand, even if it could win the trick, has lost.

=== Double or Long Hanrey ===
Jørgensen calls it Long Hanrey and says it is best played by two players; Schwartz refers to it as Double Hanrei. All is as in Single Hanrey, except that players keep the tricks they take, and always have to beat with the highest card in their hand. When the stock is used up, players keep their hand cards, pick up their tricks, and the game continues. The one who won the last trick leads off, and trumps beat here as before. Two, three, four cards can be played at once if they are of equal rank, to which a further card may be added in order to shed singletons. For example, a player who plays a set of four Sixes may follow up with a King, Queen or other card; if they cannot all be beaten, the unbeaten ones must be taken up, and the player who led the set leads again. Whoever holds the last card in his hand has lost.

=== Bunker Hanrey ===
This variant is described by Schwartz. In Bunker Hanrei, the second trick is placed on top of the first trick, the next one on top of this, and so on. A player who is unable to beat the played card must pick up the entire stack. Apart from this, the game is played in the usual way, and the one who eventually has to take up the whole pile has lost. Bunker is a Danish and Low German word for a stack of cards.

== German Hahndreier ==
German descriptions of the game are scanty and incomplete. In 1906, Fabricius recalled that "Hahnrei was one of the most popular card games of my childhood in Stralsund in the mid-1840s, when adults played card games with their children; [it was] much better than Poor Kramer and almost as good as Black Peter." His mother also taught the game to his children in the late 1870s and early 1880s. The following outline is based on their recollection.

There must be more than 2 players. Each player receives 3 cards, the rest are placed on the table as a draw pile and the top card turned for trump. If you cannot beat the card played by the person before you, you must draw another card, the next player then plays a card. A trick is only discarded if there are as many cards as players; everyone must follow suit if able, otherwise must play a trump if they can. The last player left with cards must crow as many times as there are cards in his or her hand. They called the game Hahndrei, probably because everyone had 3 cards.

=== Cheat Hahnrei ===
A German variant is Cheat Hahnrei, simply known as Hahndreier, Hahnreier or Niescherei in south Dithmarschen. Players were dealt 3 cards and always replenish their hands from stock if they drop below 3. The first card is played face up, the second face down, the third face up and so on. Each card played must beat the previous one. If someone suspects that a downcard did not head the trick, that player calls "Cheating!" (bedrogn!) or "Nosy!" (Niescherei!). If right, the player who played the card picks up the entire stack; if wrong, the challenger picks it up. The first player to shed all cards is the winner.

Otto Mensing confirms that Hahnrei is also called Hahndreih, Hahndreiher or Hahnenrei. The cheating version is bedregen Hahnrei or bedreegten Hahnrei (from betrügen "to deceive"), verdeckten Hahnrei (in Fehmarn), Hahnrei verdeckt, Hohn or Hahnrei-Racker (in Anglia), Hahnrei un Racker (in Flensburg), Hahnrei mit Naklapp or Hahnrei up'n Barg (Kh.). It had formerly been very popular, but was now (1929), little known. He acknowledges that the rules vary. Players are usually dealt 3 cards each and the next turned for trump, the rest of the stack remain face down. Cards beat each other based on their face value and players replenish their cards from the stock. Cards are beaten face down; a player who doubts the correctness of a played downcard taps the table and calls "just checking" (nieli, "curious"). Whoever is wrong picks up the pile. The player left with cards at the end is the Hahndreier. Sometimes the game is called neli Hahn ("curious chicken"), whoever is left with cards is a "rooster" and, on waking up the next morning, shouts "Cock-a-doodle-doo!" 3 times.

== Bibliography ==
- Fabricius, F. (1906). "Hahnrei" in Korrespondenzblatt des Vereins für niederdeutsche Sprachforschung. Vol. 27.
- Grimm, Jacob (1874). Deutsches Wörterbuch, Volume 4, Part 2. Leipzig: S. Hirzel.
- Hupel, August Wilhelm (1795). Idiotikon der deutschen Sprache in Lief- und Ehstland. Riga: Johann Friedrich Hartknoch.
- Jørgensen, S.A. (1802). Nyeste Dansk Spillebog. Copenhagen: J. H. Schuboth.
- Mensing, Otto, ed. (1929). Schleswig-Holsteinisches Wörterbuch: F bis J (in German). Vol. 2. Neumünster: Wachholtz Verlag. OCLC 163382434. Wikidata Q131604049.
- Schwartz, Martin (1847). Ny og Fuldstaendig Dansk Spillebog. Copenhagen: Philipsen.
- Stammerjohann, R. (1907). "Hahnrei" in Korrespondenzblatt des Vereins für niederdeutsche Sprachforschung. Vol 28, No. 1.
- Trömer, Johann Christian (1736). Jean Chretien Toucement des Deutsch Franços Schrifften. Vol. 2. Nuremberg: Raspe.
