= Wachendorf =

Wachendorf may refer to:

Locations

- Wachendorf (Syke), a village in Lower Saxony, Germany
- Wachendorf (Cadolzburg), a village in county of Fürth, Bavaria, Germany
- Wachendorf (Mechernich), a village in the county of Euskirchen, North Rhine-Westphalia, Germany
- Wachendorf (Starzach), a village in the county of Tübingen, Baden-Württemberg, Germany

People

- Hans Hartmann von Ow-Wachendorf (1882–1966), German lawyer, diplomat and Majoratsherr
- Horst Wachendorf (born 1935), German geologist
- Miles B. Wachendorf, a retired American admiral
- Wilhelm Wachendorf (1877–1949), German businessman
