= WXIX-TV =

Television station in Newport, Kentucky

- Newport, Kentucky; Cincinnati, Ohio; United States
- City: Newport, Kentucky
- Channels: Digital: 15 (UHF); Virtual: 19
- Branding: Fox 19 Now

Programming
- Affiliations: 19.1: Fox; for others, see § Technical information and subchannels

Ownership
- Owner: Gray Media; (Gray Television Licensee, LLC)
- Sister stations: WBQC-LD, WZCD-LD

History
- First air date: August 1, 1968
- Former channel numbers: Analog: 19 (UHF, 1968–2009); Digital: 29 (UHF, 2000–2019)
- Former affiliations: Independent (1968–1986)
- Call sign meaning: "XIX" is the Roman numeral for 19

Technical information
- Licensing authority: FCC
- Facility ID: 39738
- ERP: 235 kW
- HAAT: 290 m (951 ft)
- Transmitter coordinates: 39°7′19″N 84°32′52″W

Links
- Public license information: Public file; LMS
- Website: www.fox19.com

WXIX-TV (channel 19) is a television station licensed to Newport, Kentucky, United States, serving the Cincinnati metro as the market's Fox affiliate. It is owned by Gray Media alongside low-power Telemundo affiliate WBQC-LD (channel 25) and Dayton–licensed low-power independent station WZCD-LD (channel 30). The three stations share studios at 19 Broadcast Plaza on Seventh Street in the Queensgate neighborhood just west of downtown Cincinnati; WXIX-TV's transmitter is located in the South Fairmount neighborhood on the city's northwest side.

Though the construction permit for a fourth television station to serve Cincinnati—originally assigned channel 74—had been obtained by a Newport group in 1953, it took 15 years and two sales before the station was built on channel 19; its facilities have always been in Ohio. A successful independent station under U.S. Communications Corporation, Metromedia, and Malrite Communications Group before the creation of Fox in 1986, the station began producing a local newscast in 1993 and today airs local newscasts in many time slots.

== History ==
=== Prior to launch ===
On July 9, 1953, Tri-City Broadcasting Company, owner of WNOP (740 AM) in Newport, filed with the Federal Communications Commission (FCC) for a construction permit to build a television station on channel 74, which had been assigned to Newport. After Gordon Broadcasting, owner of Cincinnati radio station WSAI, dropped its application for the channel, Tri-City became unopposed, and a construction permit for WNOP-TV was granted on December 24, 1953. Jim Lang, the former Campbell County sheriff that controlled Tri-City, envisioned the studios being adjoined by an amusement complex, complete with glass-enclosed restaurant, indoor ice rink, and outdoor swimming pool.

With Lang noting the tribulations of other UHF television stations around the country, however, Tri-City opted not to build its station right away. In April 1956, Lang told a reporter for The Cincinnati Enquirer that it would only be a "matter of time" until channel 74 went on air. Some conversation around the construction permit emerged in late 1962, when Lang sold WNOP radio and the WNOP-TV construction permit to television actor Dean Miller in a deal that ultimately fell through; Tri-City had presented to the FCC a proposal to add a lower-power channel 3 station to Cincinnati (between channel 2 in Dayton and channel 3 in Louisville), which Miller also supported, though chances of approval were slim.

In early 1965, channel 74 was no closer to going on the air than it had been a decade prior, but a change in ownership would lead to the foundation being laid to start a new commercial television station in Greater Cincinnati. That March, Tri-City sold the WNOP-TV permit to Daniel H. Overmyer, who was seeking to build a chain of major-market UHF television stations, for $100,000. Two changes were nearly immediate after the purchase closed. On September 14, 1965, the call letters were changed to WSCO-TV; Overmyer's stations all bore the initials of family members, with the new designation representing his wife, Shirley Clark Overmyer. The FCC was in the process of overhauling the UHF table of allocations at the time, which—together with a rulemaking petition from Overmyer—resulted in the lower channel of 19 being substituted for 74 in 1966. Overmyer selected the Bald Knob tower site, negotiated to lease a studio facility on Eighth Street in the Queensgate neighborhood, and announced that the new station would be affiliated with the new Overmyer Network once it started. Civic leaders in Newport objected, to no avail, to the idea of the station leaving Northern Kentucky.

A launch date of February 1, 1967, was initially slated, but the station did not start on that date. Instead, in April, Overmyer reached a deal to sell 80 percent of his television station group to the American Viscose Corporation (AVC).

=== Startup and early years ===
The FCC approved the purchase of the Overmyer stations by AVC (which organized its television holdings under the name U.S. Communications Corporation) in December 1967. The following May, the call letters changed one more time to WXIX-TV, representing the Roman numeral for 19; station manager Doug McLarty also cited possible confusion with WCPO-TV in changing the call sign. From the Overmyer-built transmitter facilities and a studio site within an office suite at 801 West Eighth Street in Cincinnati, WXIX-TV debuted on the afternoon of August 1, 1968. The site from which channel 19 went on air was not the one Overmyer had selected; channel 19 was then sued by that property's owners.

Cincinnati's first commercial independent station featured a schedule consisting primarily of movies, sports, and syndicated programs, though it also produced a local daytime children's program hosted by puppeteer Larry Smith. The next year, the station debuted "The Cool Ghoul", a host of Scream-In, channel 19's Saturday night science fiction and horror movie played by Dick VonHoene. By the start of 1970, an American Research Bureau study had determined WXIX-TV was the number-one UHF independent station in the United States and in the top ten of all independents, VHF or UHF, nationwide. In 1970, the station purchased a facility on Taconic Terrace in Woodlawn, Ohio, from the defunct K & S Films for use as a larger studio base.

=== Sale to Metromedia ===
Channel 19 was demonstrating success and attracting viewership, which made it an outlier in the U.S. Communications portfolio. In March 1971, the company suspended operations at its stations in Atlanta and San Francisco, and channel 19 had cut back its broadcast day in the second half of 1970. WXIX-TV came close to joining them in silence. On August 5, 1971, The Wall Street Journal reported that U.S. Communications had asked the FCC for permission to take channel 19 and WPGH-TV in Pittsburgh off the air. The two stations, however, got a reprieve because they had instead attracted potential buyers. It was initially announced that a Washington, D.C., communications law firm, Welch and Morgan, would buy the station, but AVC insisted on the buyers endorsing the $2 million in debt associated with channel 19, which caused them to balk at the deal.

By month's end, Metromedia was in negotiations to purchase WXIX-TV, and a deal was reached in early October to purchase the station for the assumption of $3 million in liabilities. The FCC approved the deal in August 1972.

Metromedia was able to stabilize WXIX-TV, increasing its ability to attract quality programming and contributing its own productions. Furthermore, WXIX-TV started a commercial production division; as none of the other stations had entered this specialty, channel 19 was able to corner between 70 and 80 percent of this market in the Cincinnati area. In the late 1970s, the station's local programs included Cincinnati Stingers hockey games and a news magazine, In Cincinnati. While a second independent station began broadcasting in 1980, WBTI (channel 64) was a part-time subscription television station which had trimmed its ad-supported schedule to a handful of programs by 1983.

=== Malrite ownership and the arrival of Fox ===
In 1982, Metromedia entered into an agreement to buy WFLD-TV in Chicago. This $136 million deal—the most expensive purchase of an independent station and far and away the highest sale price of any UHF outlet—required it to divest of one of its two UHF stations, WXIX or KRIV in Houston, under the ownership limits of the day that allowed one company to own as many as five VHF and two additional UHF television stations. It chose to sell the Cincinnati outlet, which was in the smallest market of any in which the firm owned TV properties, and it also sold WTCN-TV in Minneapolis to finance the purchase. The buyer was Cleveland-based Malrite Communications Group. The $45 million sale was approved by the FCC in December 1983.

Under Malrite, WXIX-TV continued to be the market's leading non-network station, not far behind the network stations in early evening hours and way ahead of WBTI, which had become a full-time ad-supported station again as WIII in 1985. One advertising agency president declared it had become "one of the big boys" in local television. In the early years under Malrite, the station telecast Xavier Musketeers men's basketball before picking up a multi-year deal to air University of Cincinnati basketball games in 1987. UC basketball had previously aired on the station in the Metromedia era.

It joined Fox as a charter member in 1986. When Fox made a push into children's programming with the startup of the Fox Children's Network (later known as Fox Kids), WXIX started its own Fox Kids Club; within nine months, channel 19 had 80,000 members, outpacing projections of 50,000 in the first year. It also started a new weekly local children's show, Fridays Are Fun, hosted by Michael Flannery.

=== News startup, studio move, and Raycom purchase ===
WXIX logo used from 1996 to 2001. A similar logo was used in the 2000s, and the "19" dated to the 1980s.

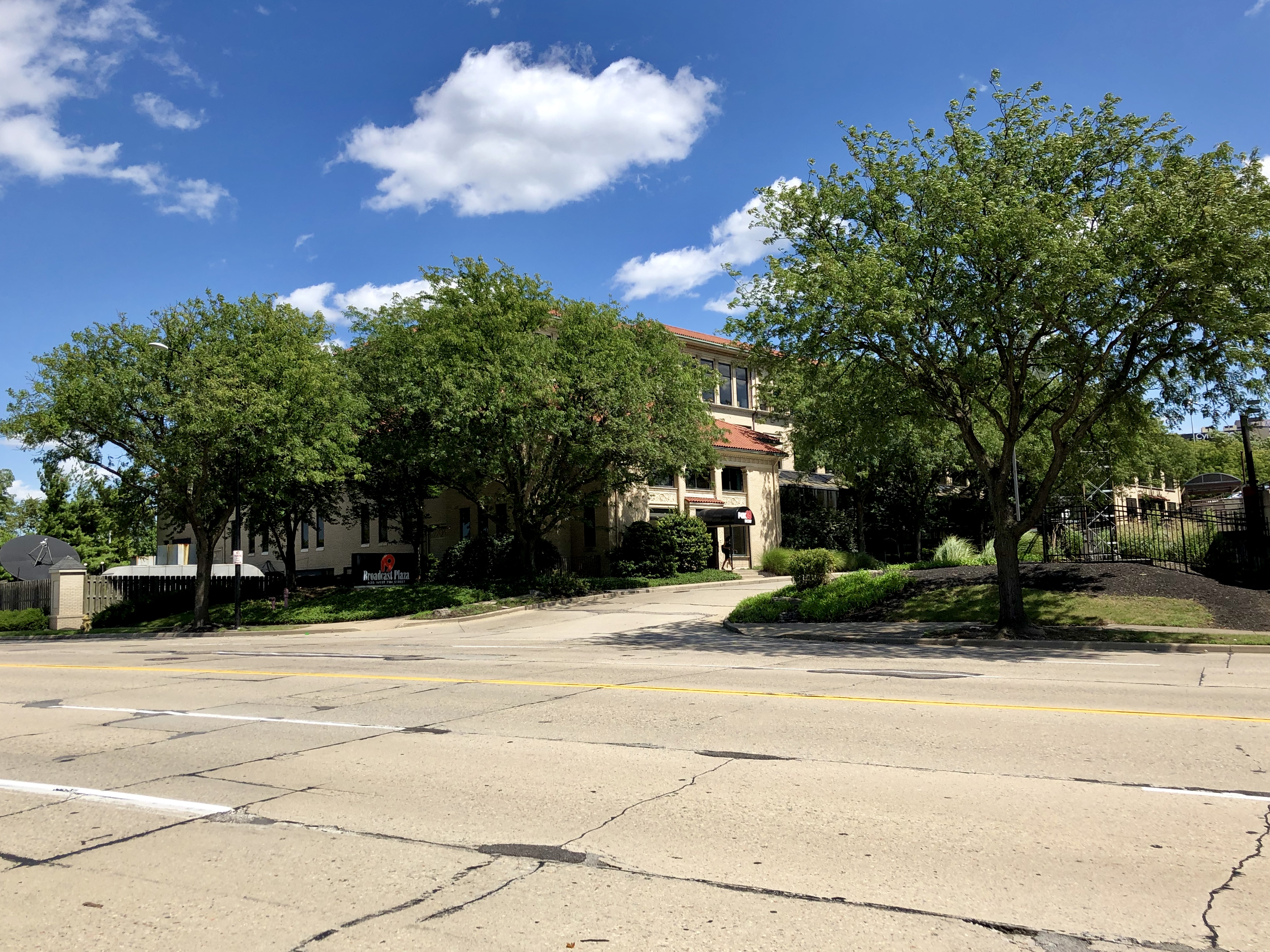
19 Broadcast Plaza, purchased by WXIX-TV in 1993 and used as its studios since 1995

From the Malrite purchase until his death from esophageal cancer in 1992, Bill T. Jenkins was channel 19's general manager; he also served on the first Fox affiliate association board and advised the creation of Fox Kids, and within Malrite, he was named executive vice president of its television station division, securing Fox affiliations for multiple Malrite stations. He was replaced by Stu Powell, WFLD's general manager; Powell then hired Greg Caputo, who had overseen the launch of a local newsroom at WFLD in 1987, to do the same in Cincinnati.

Launching local news made the Woodlawn site, 15 miles (24 km) from Cincinnati on Interstate 75, a hindrance for news crews. As a result, in 1993, WXIX-TV purchased the former Harriet Beecher Stowe School building in the Queensgate neighborhood, spending $2 million at a sheriff's sale to acquire the former black junior high school which had since been converted into offices. The station converted a third of the structure for its own use, including using the former gymnasium as its primary studio. The station moved into what was renamed "19 Broadcast Plaza" in December 1995; at the same time, it dropped its "19XIX" moniker used for a decade and became known as "Fox 19". Between 1992 and the launch of a morning newscast in 1996, WXIX-TV's staff swelled from 63 to 141 employees.

In 1998, Raycom Media purchased Malrite Communications and its five stations, three of them in Ohio. Under Raycom, the station made a series of news expansions and analyzed leaving 19 Broadcast Plaza for a larger building that could be owned rather than leased.

=== Sale to Gray Television ===
On June 25, 2018, Atlanta-based Gray Television announced that it had reached an agreement with Raycom to merge their respective broadcasting assets (consisting of Raycom's 63 existing owned-and/or-operated television stations, including WXIX-TV, and Gray's 93 television stations) under Gray's corporate umbrella in a cash-and-stock merger transaction valued at $3.6 billion. The sale was approved on December 20 of that year and was completed on January 2, 2019.

In October 2026, WXIX-TV announced that Jennifer Rieffer, five-year general manager and vice president of the station, was leaving to take on the same role at Gray sister station WBTV in Charlotte, North Carolina.

== Programming ==
=== Sports programming ===
WXIX-TV acquired the rights to air Cincinnati Bengals team programming and up to three preseason games a year in 2024 as part of a multi-year deal with the team. The Bengals had telecast their preseason games on WKRC-TV for 35 of the previous 36 seasons.

In 2025, WXIX agreed to simulcast ten Cincinnati Reds regular season games, including opening day, with FanDuel Sports Network Ohio; the games would additionally be simulcast over Rock Entertainment Sports Network (RESN) which airs on WXIX-DT3. A joint venture between Gray Media and Rock Entertainment Group, RESN launched over WXIX-DT3 in August 2024, with WXIX's feed set up to carry additional local programming.

=== News operation ===
While channel 19 studied the introduction of local news in 1978, began airing prime time news updates in 1985, and entertained expanding its news presence in 1989, it was not until the early 1990s that a full-on local newscast started at WXIX-TV. In 1993, Stu Powell of Chicago's WFLD hired that station's news director, Greg Caputo, to start a local newsroom for WXIX-TV. After a $2 million investment, WXIX's news department—the first new TV newsroom in Cincinnati since 1958—debuted on October 18, 1993. Initially, channel 19 produced a half-hour Ten O'Clock News and the short-lived Midnight News, an unusual attempt at a late-night local newscast; both programs were originally anchored by Jack Atherton and Phyllis Watson alongside chief meteorologist Rich Apuzzo and sports director Greg Hoard, the latter the only on-air talent poached from another station. In addition, Tricia Macke was brought on as a contributor—later going full-time after the station requested she stop her other modeling job—and Kevin Frazier, now the co-host of Entertainment Tonight, was the weekend sports anchor.

After channel 19 moved into the former Stowe School, several expansions of news at WXIX were carried out. The first was the extension of the 10 p.m. news to a full hour in January 1996. That fall, 19 in the Morning, a three-hour morning news program, debuted. 19 News Midday, a half-hour at 11:30 a.m., followed in May 1997. Even though the morning shows were still gaining an audience, the Ten O'Clock News was among the highest-rated in the United States. After seeing success with a 10 p.m. newscast, the station expanded further into morning news, adding a 6 a.m. hour in 1998, and ratings increased when it promoted Macke to full-time 10 p.m. anchor and hired Sheila Gray to anchor Fox 19 in the Morning in 1999.

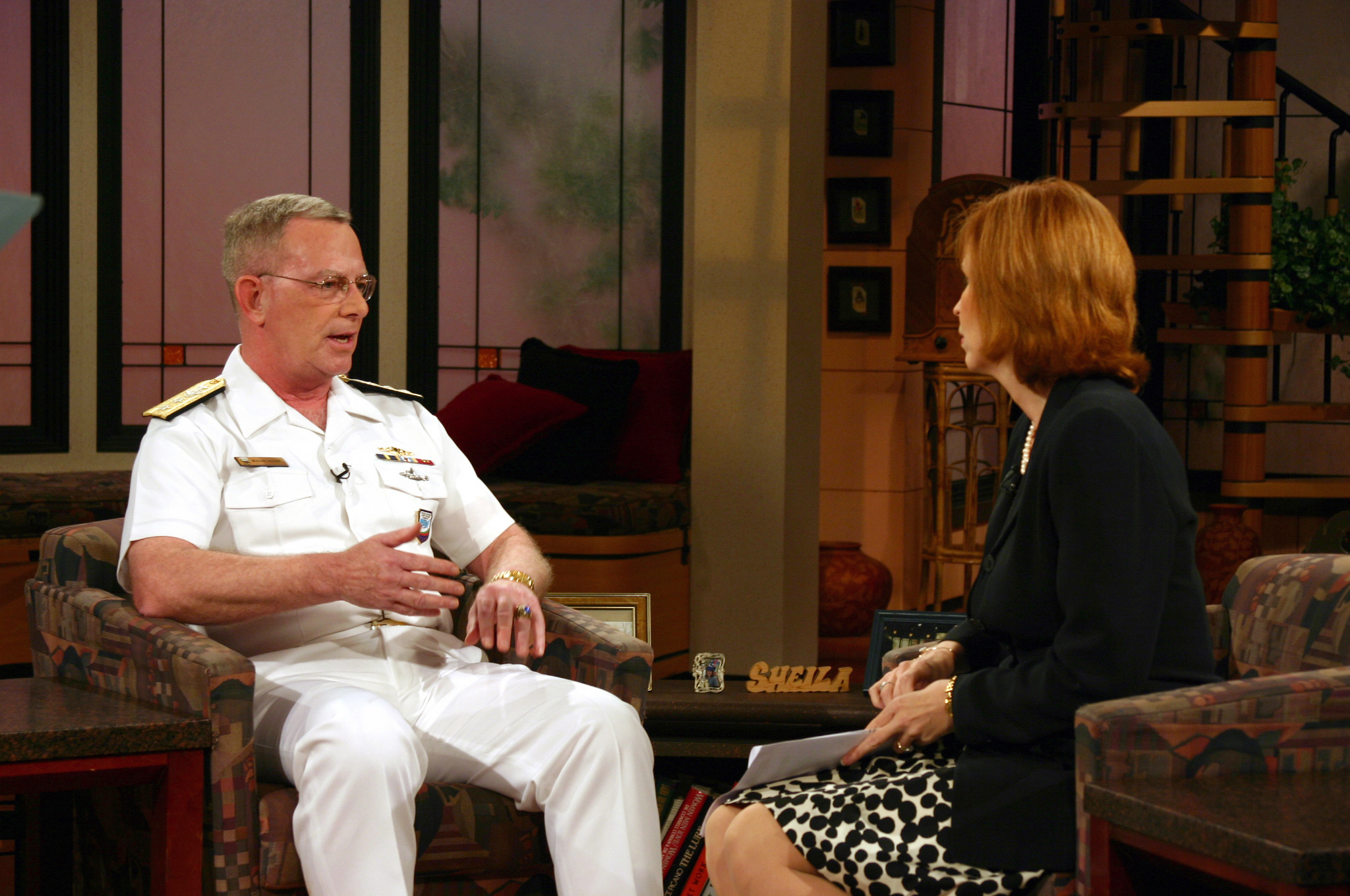
Sheila Gray (right) interviews Navy Rear Admiral Miles B. Wachendorf (left) on Fox 19 in the Morning.

After nearly a decade, news expansions began again in 2008 with the launch of the Fox 19 Evening News, a 6:30 p.m. local newscast. In 2010, 2011, and 2012, extensions to the morning newscast brought its total length at its peak to seven hours, from 4 to 11 a.m. The station would also debut weekend morning newscasts in 2012. In the 2010s, WXIX also had news sharing partnerships with WLW radio and The Cincinnati Enquirer.

In 2018, WXIX added 4 p.m. and 11 p.m. newscasts, the latter the first competition to network affiliates in that time slot in Cincinnati TV history. This was followed in January 2020 by 90 further daily minutes of news from 5 to 6:30 p.m., and in 2021, by an hour of news at 3 p.m.

=== Notable alumni ===
- Dan Hoard – radio and TV sportscaster for the Cincinnati Bengals and Cincinnati Bearcats football and basketball
- Maria LaRosa – meteorologist
- Chris Rose – sportscaster
- Ben Swann – anchor and reporter, 2010–2013

== Technical information and subchannels ==
WXIX-TV's transmitter is located in the South Fairmount neighborhood on Cincinnati's northwest side. Its signal is multiplexed:

Subchannels of WXIX-TV
Subchannel	Res.	Short name	Programming
19.1	720p	WXIX-DT	Fox
19.2	480i	H&I	Heroes & Icons
19.3	480i	RSN	Rock Entertainment Sports Network
19.4	480i	Grit	Grit
19.5	480i	ION	Ion
19.6	480i	TruCrim	True Crime Network
64.4	480i	ROAR	Roar (WSTR-TV)

Broadcast on behalf of another station

WXIX's main subchannel is carried on the ATSC 3.0 (Next Gen TV) multiplex of WSTR-TV, which launched in 2021; in exchange, WXIX hosts one of WSTR's subchannels.

=== Analog-to-digital conversion ===
WXIX-TV ended regular programming on its analog signal, over UHF channel 19, on June 12, 2009, as part of the federally mandated transition from analog to digital television. The station's digital signal remained on its pre-transition UHF channel 29 until being repacked to channel 15 in 2019.
