= The Olmsted Scholar Program =

United States military scholarship

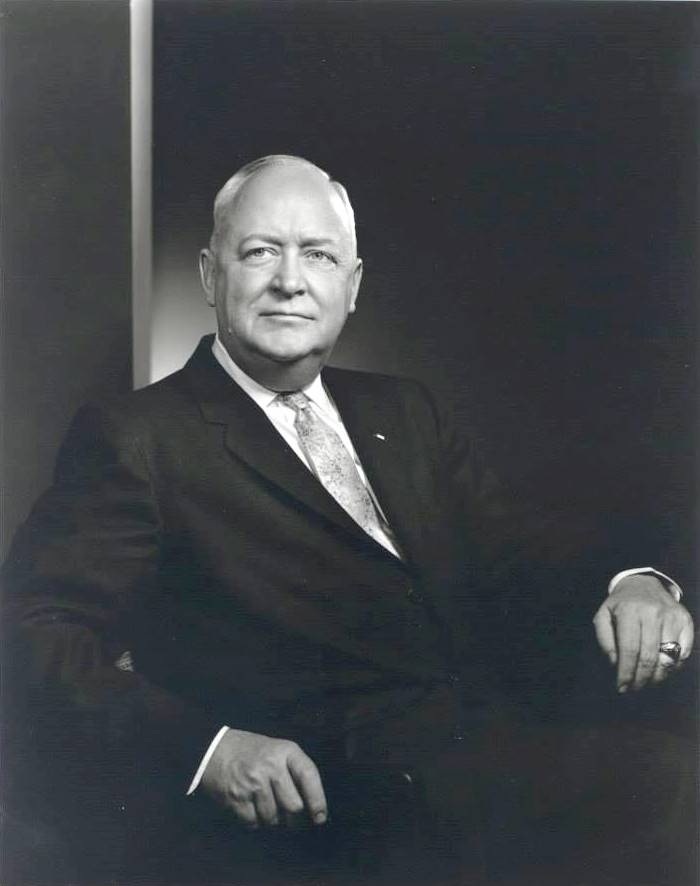
George H. Olmsted

The Olmsted Scholar Program, named after George H. Olmsted, awards scholarships to highly qualified, active duty junior officers in the United States military in order to pursue language studies and overseas graduate-level education. Created in concert with the Department of Defense, the Scholar Program provides one year of foreign language training followed by two years of study at a foreign graduate school.

The Scholar Program was established with an initial grant from George and Carol Olmsted in 1957. In his original Statement of Donor, Olmsted noted, "Fundamental to the initial purpose of creating the scholarship program is the conviction that the greatest leaders must be educated broadly." Since its inception, the Olmsted Scholar Program has provided grants for over 800 officers, many of whom have gone on to the highest levels of leadership and responsibility in the military, government and private sector.

== History ==
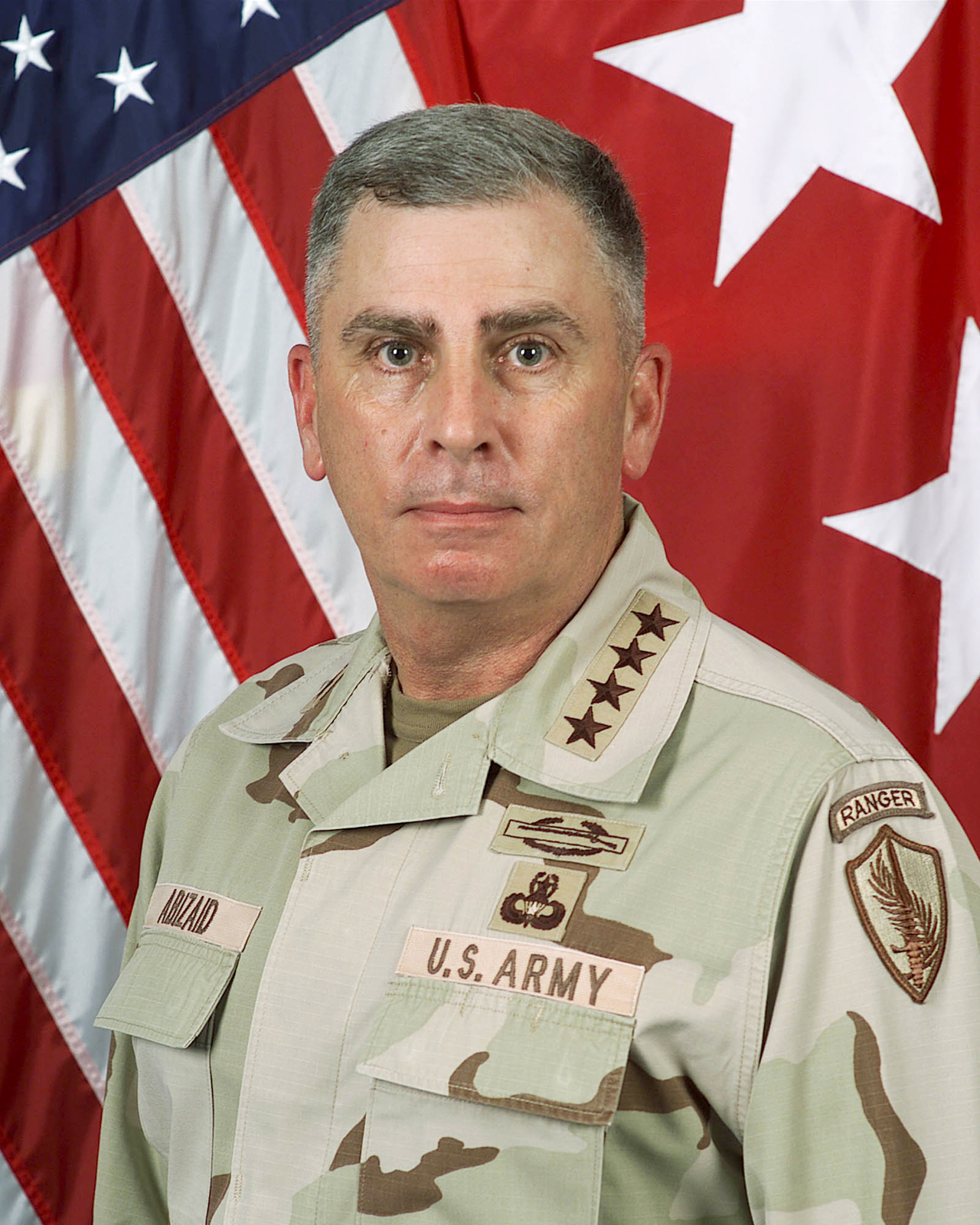
GEN John Abizaid (USA, Ret.), Olmsted Scholar Class of 1978

The Olmsted Scholar Program was founded in 1959 by the George Olmsted Foundation (later the George and Carol Olmsted Foundation). Utilizing General Olmsted's initial $80,000 grant, the Foundation's Board of Directors and the Department of Defense authorized the establishment of Scholar Program. The first six scholars were selected in October, 1959 and began their training in 1960 (See Class of 1960).

From 1960 through 1970, the program consisted of two Scholars from each service academy for a total of six annually. Beginning with the Scholar Class of 1971, the program was expanded to nine Scholars annually with the additional three being graduates of ROTC programs.

Since its inception, the Scholar Program has encouraged attendance at universities in countries throughout the world. In 1975 the first Scholar was sent behind the Iron Curtain when Col Bill McKeever (USAF, Ret.) attended the University of Belgrade. GEN John Abizaid (USA, Ret.) became the first Scholar to study in Arabic when he attended the University of Jordan in 1978. In 1981 LTC Lonnie Keene (USA, Ret.) became the first Scholar in mainland China at Beijing University, and in 1994 COL Tom Donovan became the first Scholar in Russia, attending Saint Petersburg State University.

Beginning with the Scholar Class of 2003, additional funds from General Olmsted's estate have allowed the program to expand to approximately 18 participants per year. While the actual number of Scholars in a given year depends on selection of the most highly qualified individuals, the nominal distribution is five Scholars each from the Navy, Army and Air Force, three from the Marine Corps and one from the United States Coast Guard.

To date, over 600 Scholars comprising 57 Olmsted Scholar classes have been selected. These Scholars have been assigned to more than 200 universities in 60 distinct non-English speaking countries. 40 Olmsted Scholars have become flag officers, to include 12 Army generals, 12 Navy admirals, 2 Marine Corps generals, and 14 Air Force generals.

== Recipients ==
=== Inaugural class of 1960 ===
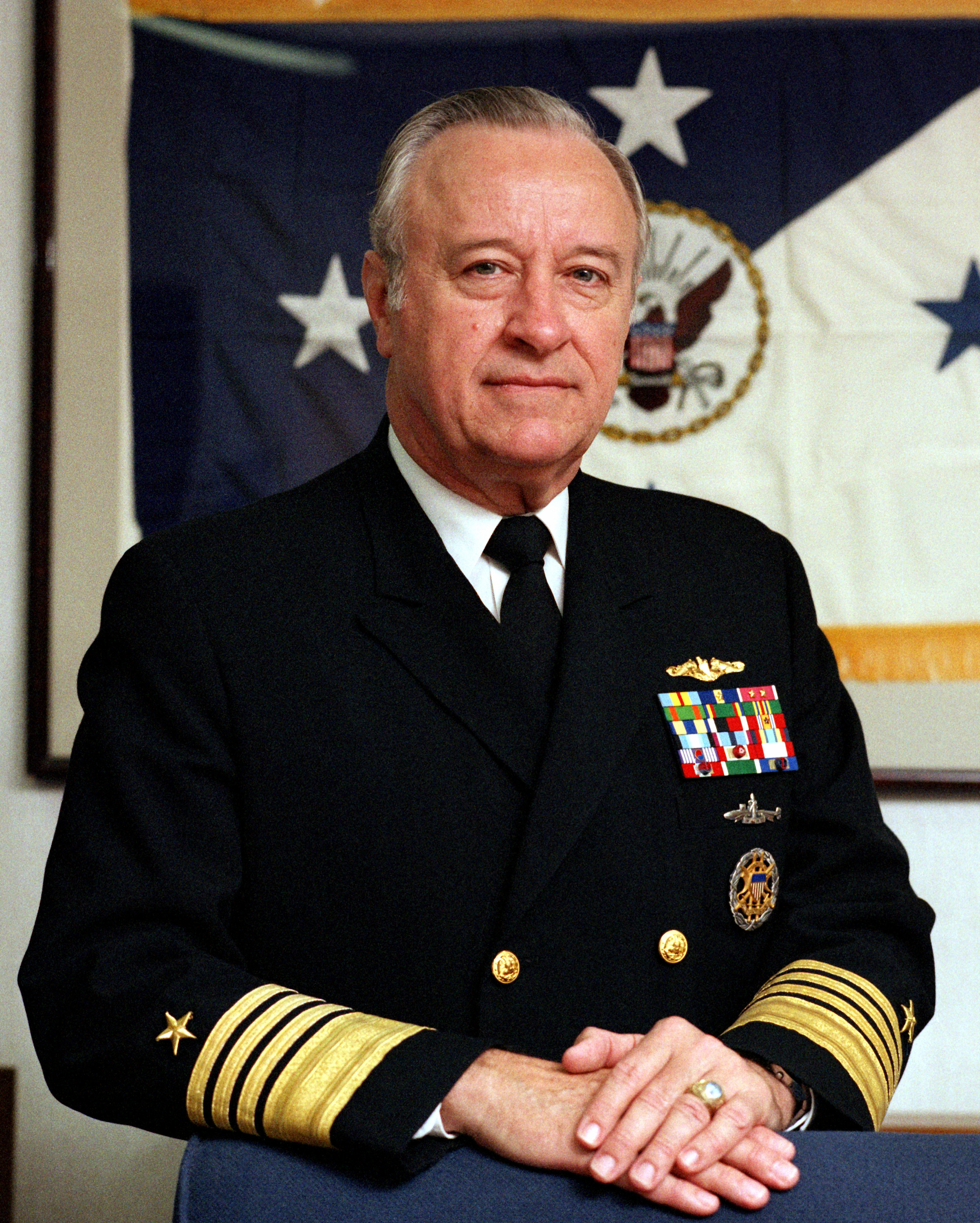
ADM Carlisle Trost(USN, Ret.), Olmsted Scholar Class of 1960

The original class of Olmsted Scholars began language training in 1959 and began their overseas graduate studies in 1960:

- ADM Carlisle Trost, USN, University of Freiburg, Germany
- LTG Frederic Brown, USA, University of Geneva, Switzerland
- COL William Albright, USAF, University of Geneva, Switzerland
- COL Richard Hobbs, USA University of Lyon, France
- John Karas, USAF University of Göttingen, Germany
- Forrest Lockwood, USN, University of Grenoble, France

=== Later Recipients ===
- John Abizaid
- George Lee Butler
- William Douglas Crowder
- Robert McFarlane
- Miles B. Wachendorf
- James P. Wisecup

== Required qualifications for participation ==
While the specific qualifications differ by service branch, the following general requirements for participation have been designated by the Olmsted Foundation:

- Active duty officer in the United States Military
- At least 3, but no more than 11, years of active duty service
- Have served primarily in an operational capacity
- Outstanding professional performance and promotion potential
- Demonstrated scholastic achievement
- Approval of respective service career planner/detailer/assignment officer
- A commitment to the foundation's goals as evidenced in a personal interview

== Application and selection process ==
Specific application and selection procedures differ by service branch, but generally consist of the following:

- Candidate submits application to chain of command for approval

If Approved by Chain of Command

- Candidate's application forwarded to individual service's Olmsted Scholar board for consideration (convened in the Summer or Fall)

If Selected by Individual Service

- Candidate's application forwarded to Olmsted Foundation for consideration, interview scheduled (interviews held in the Fall or Winter)

The Olmsted Foundation's final selections are typically announced in late March. Along with overall selection, it is at this point that Scholars are told in which city and country they will study.
