= The Cool Ghoul =

American television personality

The Cool Ghoul (Dick Von Hoene)

The Cool Ghoul was a popular radio and TV character and horror movie host in Cincinnati, Ohio, created and portrayed by Dick Von Hoene, a Cincinnati native. With his trademark shout "Bleah, bleah, BLEAAAHHH!" and his inimitable tongue-fluttering "Bl-bl-bl-bl-bl-bl-bl-bl-bl-bl...", The Cool Ghoul was an icon of Cincinnati television, radio and local pop culture for over four decades.

When not donning the makeup and wig on the classic 1970s horror movie show Scream-In, Von Hoene doubled as a news anchor on WXIX, and later hosted other news, radio, and public affairs shows in Cincinnati and northern Kentucky, including Northern Kentucky Magazine, which he was hosting at the time of his death.

== Character ==
The Cool Ghoul's origins date back to 1961, when Von Hoene worked on a WCPO (now WDBZ) radio show called "Bob Smith's Monster Mash". Around that time, The Cool Ghoul started appearing in comedy routines Von Hoene wrote for colleague and puppeteer Larry Smith.

By 1969, Von Hoene had moved into television, working at the fledgling TV station WXIX in Cincinnati. It was at this time that Von Hoene developed a costume for the character. Initially, the character proved to be a little too scary for children, so Von Hoene altered the character to it more silly than scary.

The Cool Ghoul's wig, a bright orange-reddish coiffure, became the trademark for the character. Many years later, Von Hoene was told that it was only the rear half of a wig that costumer Dana Bruce made for a customer who was subsequently killed in a car crash. After the woman's death, the wig had been cut in half - the front from the back - and the front part was reportedly placed on the woman's body in the coffin.

== Scream-In ==
Early 70s Promo slide for Scream-In on WXIX-TV

During the early 1970s, The Cool Ghoul hosted his own Saturday night horror movie show, Scream-In (the name was taken from Rowan & Martin's Laugh-In). The Cool Ghoul's campy but loveable sense of humor endeared him to fans both young and old. The Cool Ghoul had visitors on his show often, including Larry Smith's Hattie the Witch.

Von Hoene could do an uncanny vocal impersonation of horror icon Boris Karloff, and so he was also the off-screen voice announcer for the show. Longtime WXIX announcer Greg Eversull claims Von Hoene's Karloff impression was so good, it even fooled a lady who was the real Karloff's private secretary for 30 years.

In 1971, Von Hoene released The Cool Ghoul's Phantasmagorical Funky Fonograf Record, featuring a parody of the 1920s standard "Has Anybody Seen My Gal?" called "Ten Foot Two, Eyes Of Glue (Has Anybody Seen My Ghoul)".

Scream-In ran only three and a half years, but the Cool Ghoul had become so popular that he continued to make numerous public appearances for years, including occasional commercials and annual TV appearances almost every Halloween. As The Cool Ghoul, Von Hoene also took part in various fundraisers in and around Cincinnati with local sports teams. The Cincinnati Reds gave The Cool Ghoul a jersey with the "number zero".

In the early 1980s, Von Hoene took The Cool Ghoul to WCTI-TV in New Bern, North Carolina, earning a new generation of fans in the process.

== Personal life ==
Von Hoene was a Cincinnati native, raised in Madisonville and lived most of his life in Price Hill, both Cincinnati neighborhoods. He earned a B.A. in history and a M.A. in theater from the University of Cincinnati. His real name and stage name were spelled exactly the same, but pronounced differently; at home it was "Haney", on the air it was "Hane."

Dick Von Hoene died of a heart attack at age 63 on February 4, 2004. He was buried at Spring Grove Cemetery in Cincinnati.

== Sources and external links ==
- Cincinnati Enquirer Tribute to VonHoene
