= Engeln =

- Ortsteil of Bruchhausen-Vilsen
- Interactive map of Engeln
- Location within Germany Location within Lower Saxony
- Coordinates: 52°45′N 08°55′E
- Country: Germany
- State: Lower Saxony
- District: Diepholz
- Municipality: Bruchhausen-Vilsen
- Subdivisions: 4 Ortsteile

Area
  - Total: 31.22 km^{2} (12.05 sq mi)
- Elevation: 47 m (154 ft)

Population (2010-12-31)
  - Total: 1,074
  - Density: 34.40/km^{2} (89.10/sq mi)
- Time zone: UTC+01:00 (CET)
  - Summer (DST): UTC+02:00 (CEST)
- Postal codes: 27305
- Dialling codes: 04247
- Vehicle registration: DH
- Website: www.gemeinde-engeln.de

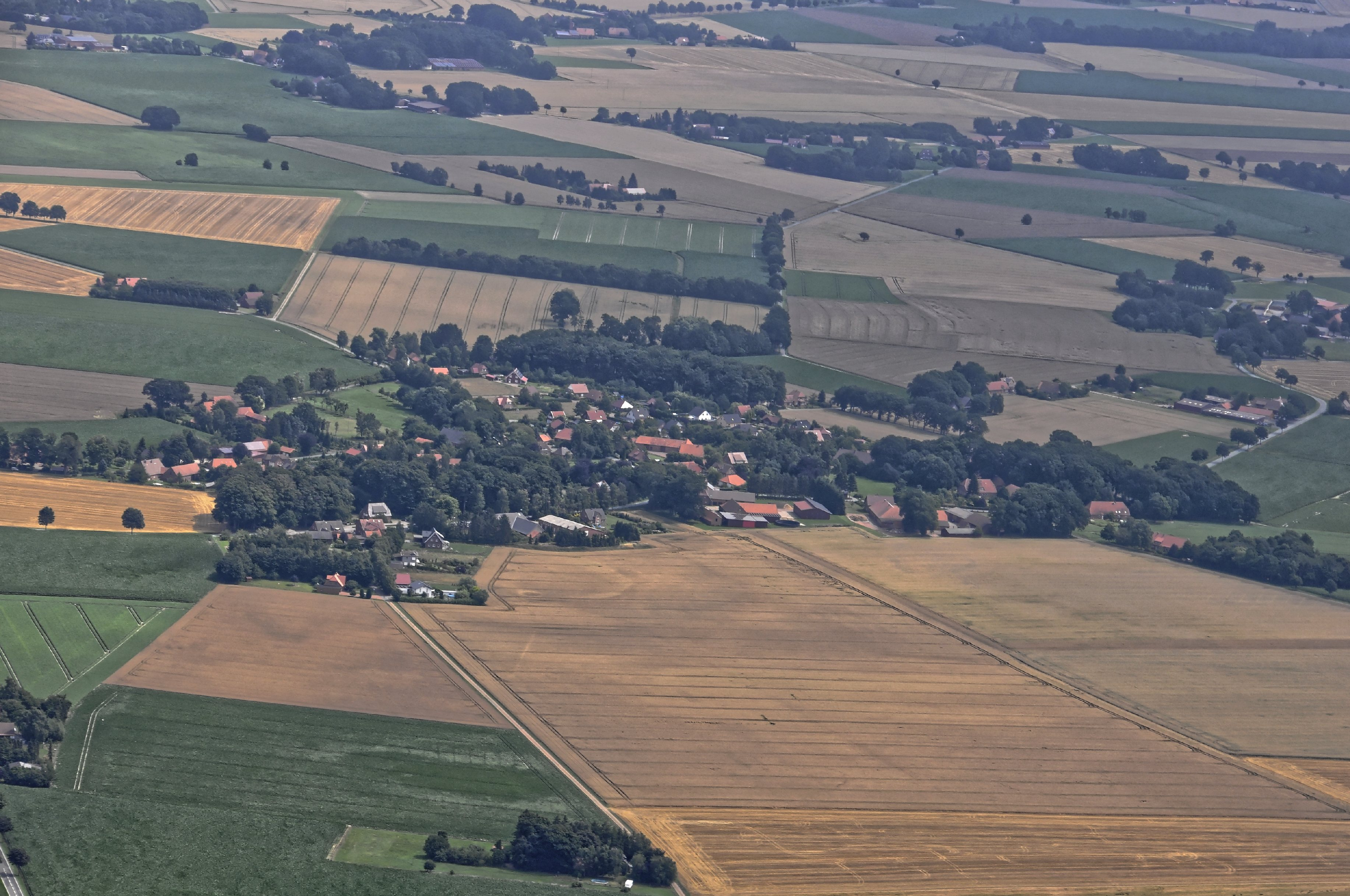

Engeln is a village and a former municipality in the district of Diepholz, in Lower Saxony, Germany. Since 1 November 2011, it is part of the municipality Bruchhausen-Vilsen.
