= Wachendorf (Syke) =

- Stadtteil of Syke
- Interactive map of Wachendorf
- Location within Germany Location within Lower Saxony
- Coordinates: 52°52′28″N 08°54′19″E
- Country: Germany
- State: Lower Saxony
- District: Diepholz
- Town: Syke

Area
  - Total: 11.10 km^{2} (4.29 sq mi)

Population (2006)
  - Total: 476
  - Density: 42.9/km^{2} (111/sq mi)
- Time zone: UTC+01:00 (CET)
  - Summer (DST): UTC+02:00 (CEST)
- Postal codes: 28857
- Dialling codes: 04240

Wachendorf is a village in the town of Syke in the district of Diepholz in the North German state of Lower Saxony.

== Geography ==
=== Location ===
Wachendorf is located in the borough of Syke. Together with the other villages of Henstedt, Heiligenfelde, Gödestorf and Jardinghausen it makes up the southern part of the borough. The historical parishes of Borstel, Hillenberg, Kirchberg, Legenhausen, Neddernheide, Vöhrde and Kolonie Wachendorf belong to Wachendorf.

Wachendorf is part of the church parish of Heiligenfeld together with Henstedt, Heiligenfelde, Gödestorf and Jardinghausen.

=== Neighbours ===
Wachendorf is on the southeastern edge of Syke and its neighbours are Jardinghausen, Heiligenfelde and Gödestorf. To the east is the municipality of Thedinghausen; to the south is Süstedt in the municipality of Bruchhausen-Vilsen.

=== Rivers and streams ===
In the eastern part of the municipality bordering on Thedinghausen, flows the Süstedter Bach, which rises in Süstedt and empties east of Weyhe-Kirchweyhe into the lake of the Kirchweyher . For part of its length is forms the boundary with Thedinghausen (Emtinghausen and Riede).

== History ==
On 1 March 1974 Wachendorf was incorporated into the borough of Syke.

=== Population ===
- 1950: 848
- 1961: 562
- 1966: 539
- 1970: 531
- 1982: 492
- 2006: 476

== Infrastructure ==
Wachendorf does not have its own church nor a cemetery. The war memorial in the centre commemorates the names of the fallen and missing from the First and Second World Wars.

=== Transport ===
==== Road ====
Wachendorf lies far from major arteries. The nearest federal road, the B 6, runs 2.5 km to the west through Heiligenfelde and offers good connections to the north (to Bremen, the A 1 and A 27) and to the south (to Hanover and the A 2).

By 1974 all of Wachendorf's roads had names and several tracks were christened. There are 23 named roads and tracks. In addition there are several field tracks that remain nameless. Two well surfaced main roads (the Kreisstraßen K 121 and K 129) cross the village and divide it into various areas:

- the Kirchberg (K 129) runs westwards to Heiligenfelde / B 6
- Wachendorfer Straße (K 129) runs southeast to Süstedt
- Gödestorfer Straße (K 121) runs north to Gödestorf

==== Rail ====
- The railway station in Syke about 9 km northwest of Wachendorf is on the Bremen-Osnabrück line.
- Wachendorf is a halt on the museum railway of "Kaffkieker". This heritage line was operated from 1987 to 1991 and was re-opened in 2006 between Syke and Eystrup.

== Personalities ==
- Rudi Carrell (born 19 December 1934 in Alkmaar, Netherlands as Rudolf Wijbrand Kesselaar; died 7 July 2006 in Bremen) was a Dutch singer, showmaster and entertainer. From 1975 to his death in 2006 he lived in Wachendorf.

== Literature ==
- Wachendorf. In: Heinz-Hermann Böttcher, Heiner Büntemeyer, Hermann Greve und Wilfried Meyer: SYKE und umzu. Syke 1983, ISBN 3-923965-00-1, Seite 192–197
- Wachendorf. In: Hermann Greve u. Gabriele Ullrich: 13mal Syke. Eine historische Lesereise. Weyhe 1992, Seite 129–139
- Sumpfdotterblumen-Route (u. a. Wachendorf). In: Hermann Greve u. Gabriele Ullrich: Unterwegs ... in Syke. Ein Kultur- und Naturreiseführer für Syke und seine Ortsteile. Ein Führer durch die Hachestadt. Natur – Kultur – Geschichte. Fischerhude 2002, Seite 102–123
