= Greg Hoard =

American journalist (1951 or 1952 – 2025)

Greg Hoard (1951 – February 27, 2025) was an American newspaper journalist, television sports broadcaster and the author of the Joe Nuxhall biography, JOE: Rounding Third And Heading For Home (ISBN 1-882203-37-2).

Hoard joined the sports department at The Cincinnati Post in 1979 as a feature reporter and columnist, and The Cincinnati Enquirer in 1984 as the Reds beat writer. Hoard moved into television and worked for WLWT-TV in Cincinnati, Ohio, from 1990 to 1993, before joining WXIX-TV as sports director until 2005. He ultimately quit television work, saying he never felt comfortable in the medium.

Hoard died on February 27, 2025, at the age of 73.
