= Johann Christian Trömer =

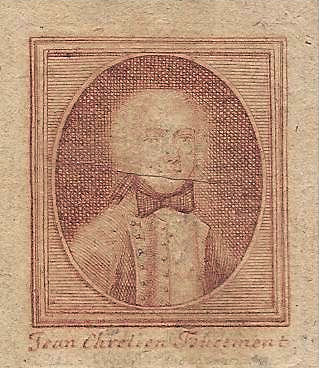
Johann Christian Trömer alias Jean Chretien Toucement

Johann Christian Trömer, also called Jean Chrétien Toucement, (1697–1756) was a French-German dialect poet and entertainer at the court of Prince-Elector Augustus the Strong, who was also King of Poland and Grand Duke of Lithuania.

== Life ==
Trömer is the historical archetype of the "German-Frenchman" who Gotthold Ephraim Lessing helped achieve immortality in the comedy, Minna von Barnhelm. Although he was born in Dresden in 1697, almost nothing is known about his youth, other than that he trained as a storekeeper. Apparently he was the son of a French soldier in Saxon service. He studied at Wittenberg and Leipzig. Later, he worked in several bookstores, where he was able to acquire some self-taught knowledge of the world. He worked as a valet at the Saxon court in Weissenfels early on and then moved constantly, living at Vienna, Breslau, Saint Petersburg, Danzig and Potsdam before returning to his native Dresden, where his first literary work, Ehn curieuse Brief, made him an instant popular figure in 1728 at the court of Augustus the Strong.

From then on he remained permanently at the Dresden court, although only in a subordinate position among the servants, but always present at court, even when travelling. In a consistently consistent style, in comical Alexandrines in the German-French dialect, he continually contributes to the entertainment of court society. After every court festival, every hunt, every state visit, the amusing "German-Frenchman" reported the events as a pure, comment-free record, without any picaresque criticism. His comedy lay solely in the dialect. There are almost a hundred individual prints of these popular poems, as well as several opulently illustrated contemporary complete editions.

He died on 1 May 1756 in the city of his birth, Dresden, his obituary noting that he was a Royal Polish and Electoral Saxon "Ober-Post-Commissar".

== Collected writings ==
- Jean Chretien Toucement Deusch Francos Schrifften mit viel schön Kuffer Stück Kanss Complett. Nuremberg 1772 (last, most complete of the five collected editions)

== List of works and literature ==
- Johann Christian Trömer (1697-1756). In: Gerhard Dünnhaupt: Personalbibliographien zu den Drucken des Barock. Volume 6: Spear - Zincgref. Die Register (= Hiersemanns bibliographische Handbücher 9, 6). 2nd improved and significantly expanded edn. Hiersemann, Stuttgart 1993, ISBN 3-7772-9305-9, pp. 4083–4102.

== Literature ==
- Oskar Ludwig Bernhard Wolff: Encyclopädie der deutschen Nationalliteratur oder biographisch-kritisches Lexicon der deutschen Dichter und Prosaisten seit den frühesten Zeiten; nebst Proben aus ihren Werken. Band 7, Leipzig 1842, pp. 395ff.
- Erich Schmidt (1894). "Trömer, Johann Christian". Allgemeine Deutsche Biographie (in German). Vol. 38. Leipzig: Duncker & Humblot. pp. 636–639.
- Hans Beschorner (1906), Neues Archiv für sächsische Geschichte (Beschreibungen ... des Zeithainer Lagers von 1730), vol. 27, pp. 87–151
- Franz Weinitz (1900), Des "Deutsch-Francoss" Jean Chrétien Toucements Schilderung Berlins aus dem Jahre 1730, Berlin
- I. Altgrimm-Fiala (1954), Beschreibung der Geburtstagsfeier Augusts des Starken, bei der Johann Sebastian Bach eine Huldigungsmusik präsentierte, Wien
- Goedecke, Karl. (1891). "Nationale Dichtung" in Geschichte der Deutschen Dichtung, ed. by Edmund Goetze. Vol 4. Dresden: L. Ehlermann.
- Katharina Middell: Der "Deutsch-Franzos", in: Thomas Höpel (ed.), Deutschlandbilder ‒ Frankreichbilder, 1700‒1850. Rezeption und Abgrenzung zweier Kulturen (University of Leipzig, publications by the France Centre, 6), Leipzig 2001, pp. 199-220.
