= Bruchhausen-Vilsen =

- Municipality
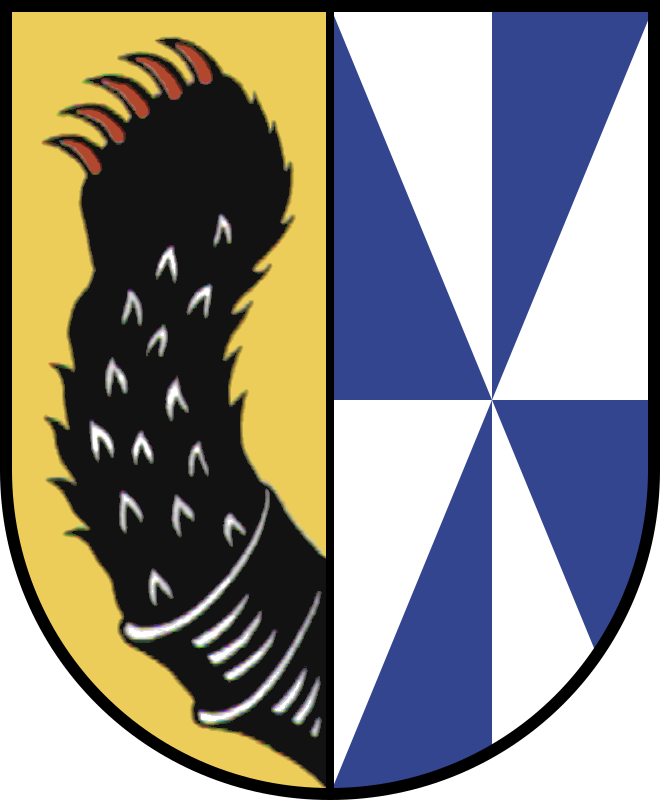
- Coat of arms

- Location of Bruchhausen-Vilsen within Diepholz district
- Interactive map of Bruchhausen-Vilsen
- Location within Germany Location within Lower Saxony
- Coordinates: 52°50′N 09°00′E
- Country: Germany
- State: Lower Saxony
- District: Diepholz
- Municipal assoc.: Bruchhausen-Vilsen

Government
  - Mayor: Peter Schmitz

Area
  - Total: 109.73 km^{2} (42.37 sq mi)
- Elevation: 14 m (46 ft)

Population (2025-12-31)
  - Total: 8,957
  - Density: 81.63/km^{2} (211.4/sq mi)
- Time zone: UTC+01:00 (CET)
  - Summer (DST): UTC+02:00 (CEST)
- Postal codes: 27305
- Dialling codes: 04252
- Vehicle registration: DH

Bruchhausen-Vilsen (German pronunciation: [bʁʊxˈhaʊzn̩ ˈfɪlzn̩]; Low German: Brooksen-Vilsen) is a municipality in the Diepholz district, in Lower Saxony, Germany. It is situated 38 km (24 mi) southeast of Bremen. The nearby communities of Berxen, Bruchhöfen, Bruchmühlen, Dille, Gehlbergen, Heiligenberg, Homfeld, Nenndorf, Riethausen, Stapelshorn, Wöpse, Oerdinghausen, Scholen, Weseloh, Süstedt and Engeln all belong to Bruchhausen-Vilsen. Bruchhausen-Vilsen is also the seat of the Samtgemeinde ("collective municipality") Bruchhausen-Vilsen.

== History ==
Bruchhausen-Vilsen originated from the 3 communities of Bruchhausen, Moor and Vilsen. Bruchhausen was first mentioned in 1189, and Vilsen in 1227. In 1870 Moor and Bruchhausen were united. In 1929 Bruchhausen and Vilsen were merged into the community of Bruchhausen-Vilsen. Since 1974 Bruchhausen-Vilsen has been the administrative center of the Samtgemeinde Bruchhausen-Vilsen. In 1976 Bruchhausen-Vilsen was recognized as a health resort.

== Politics ==
=== Community Council ===
Municipal Elections of 10 September 2006:

- CDU Group - 9 seats
- SPD/Green Group - 10 seats

=== Coat of Arms ===
The coat of arms contain a bear claw in the right half, representing the counts of Hoya, and a blue and white gyron in the left, representing the counts of Bruchhausen. The arms originated in 1551 in Bruchhausen and were carried over when Bruchhausen and Vilsen united in 1928.

== Culture and Attractions ==
=== Museum ===
- Railway Museum

The first railway museum in Germany, operated since 1966 by the German Railway Association (Deutscher Eisenbahn-Verein), runs a tourist railway (heritage railway) from Bruchhausen-Vilsen to Asendorf on weekends and holidays from May to September. The museum presents exhibits on various train subjects and has an extensive railway car collection (about 100 vehicles).

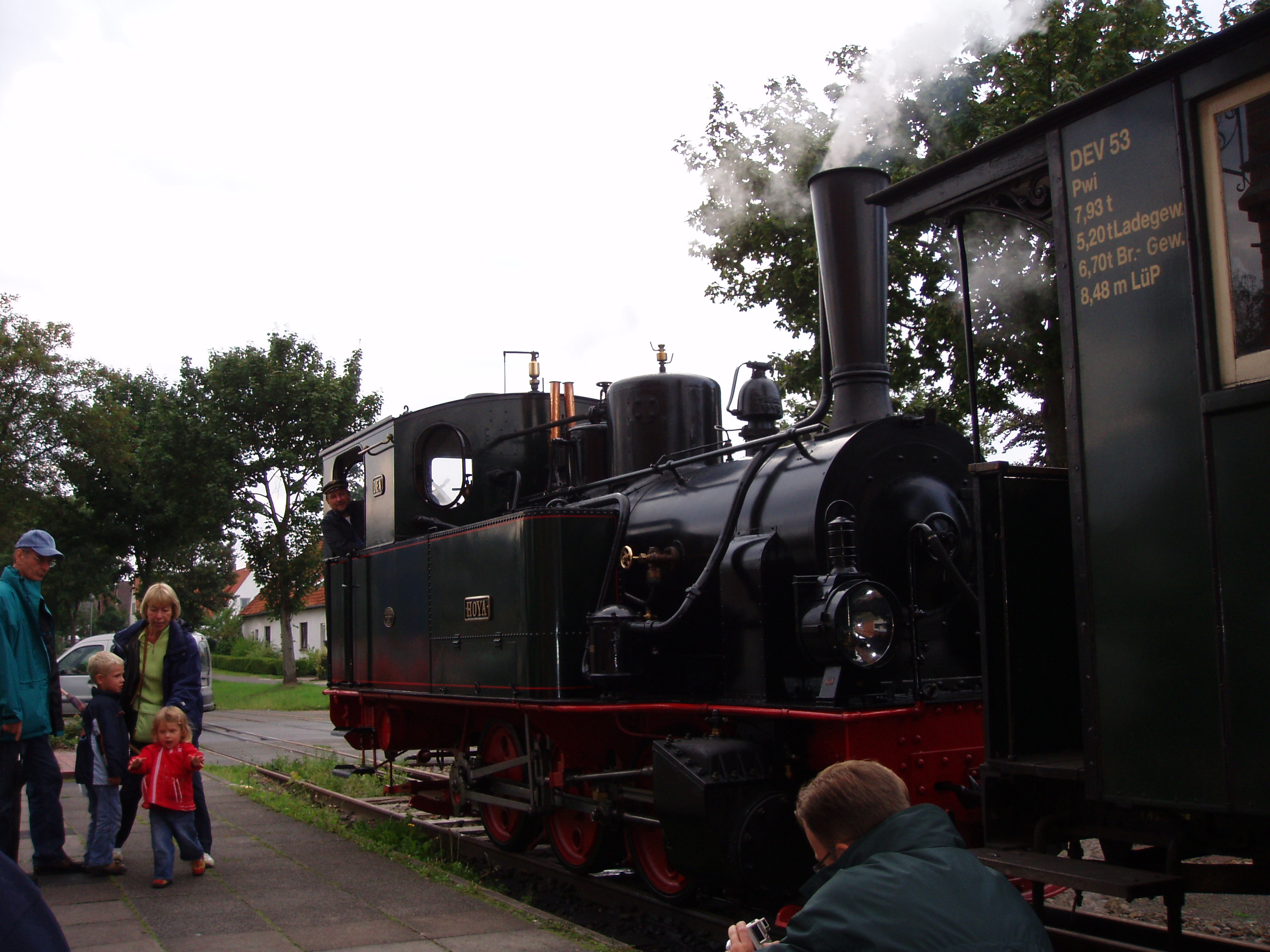
“Hoya” engine in the museum's station

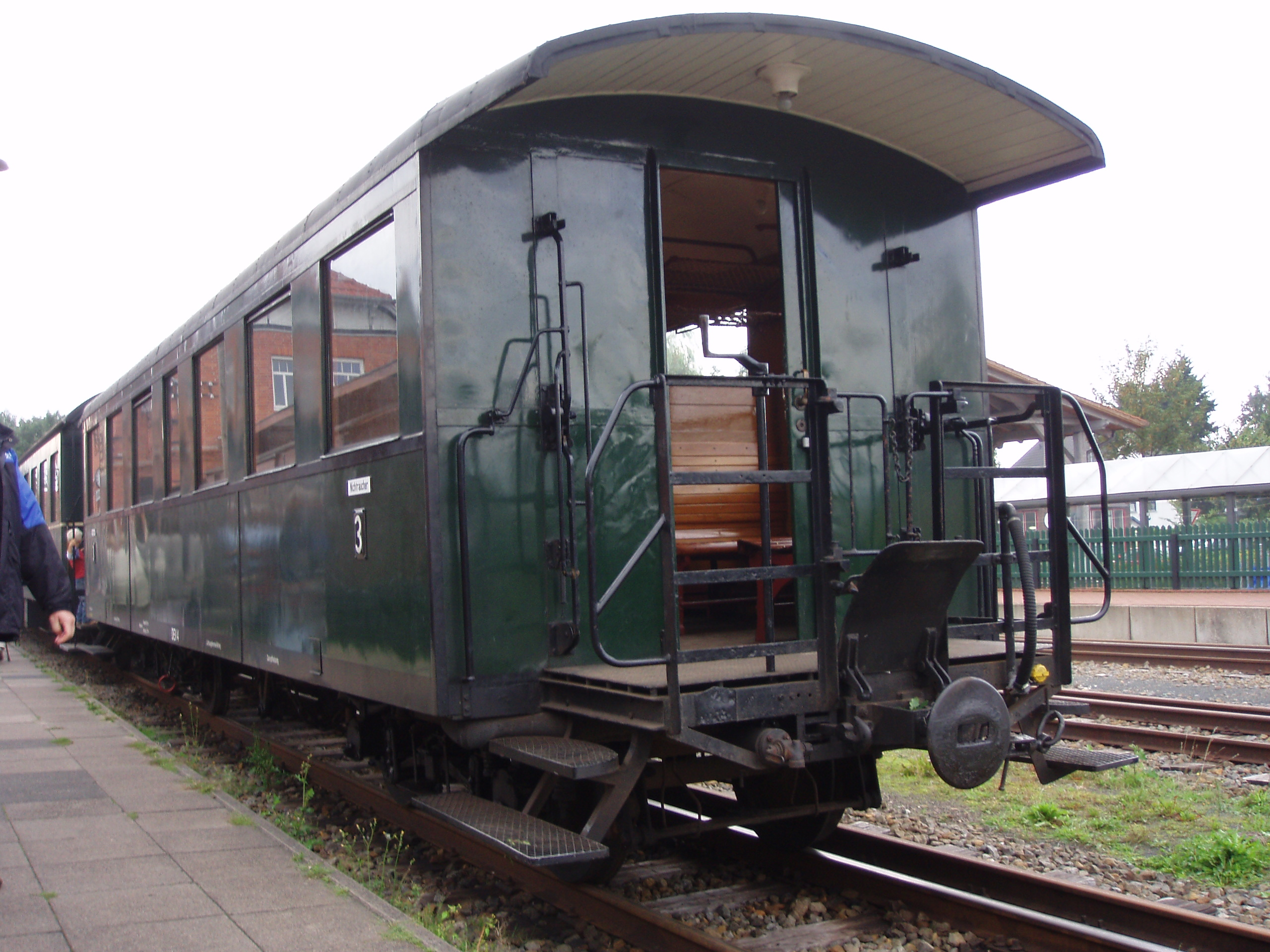
Passenger car No. 4 of the Railway Museum

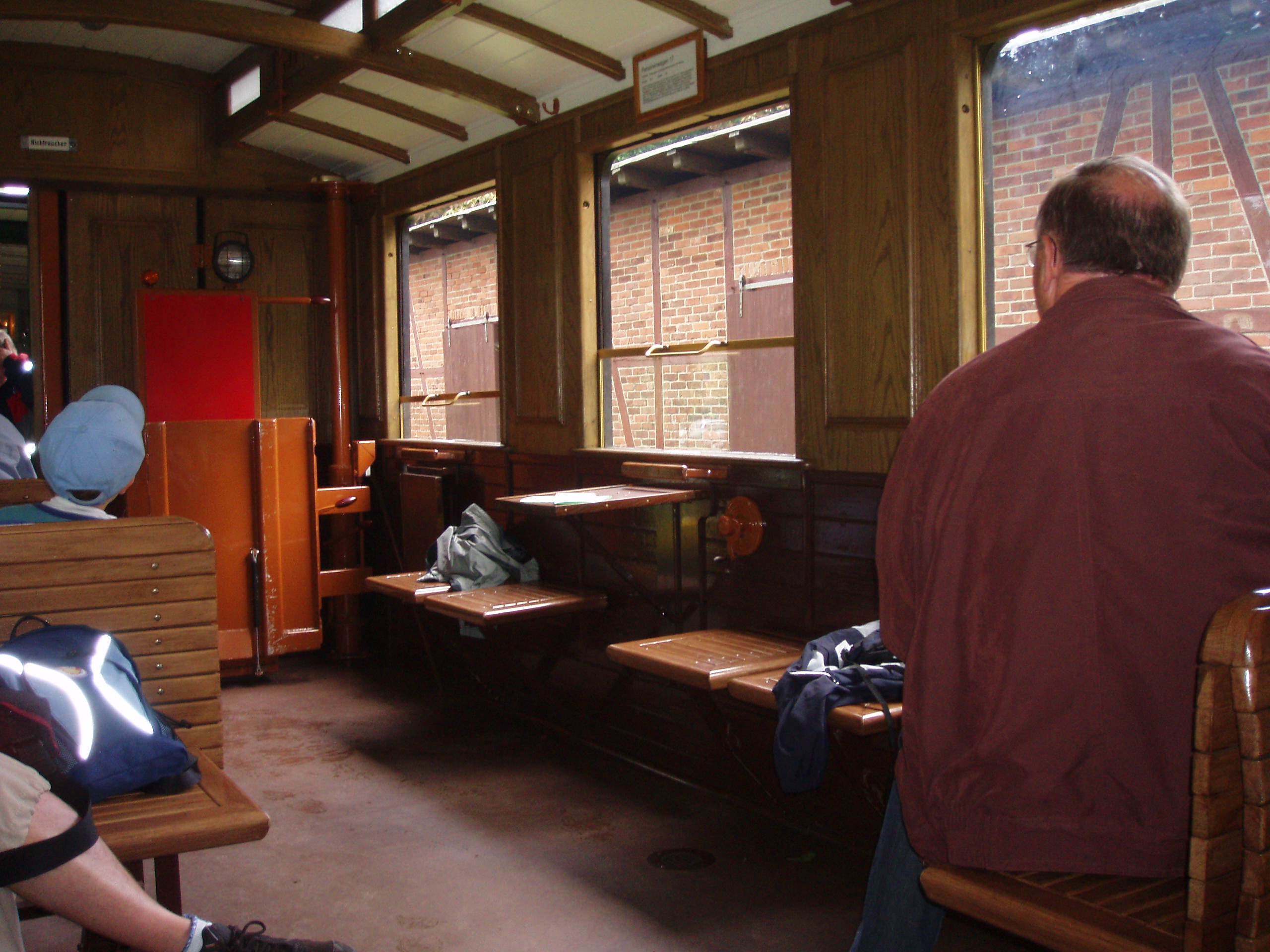
Interior of museum’s passenger car No. 17

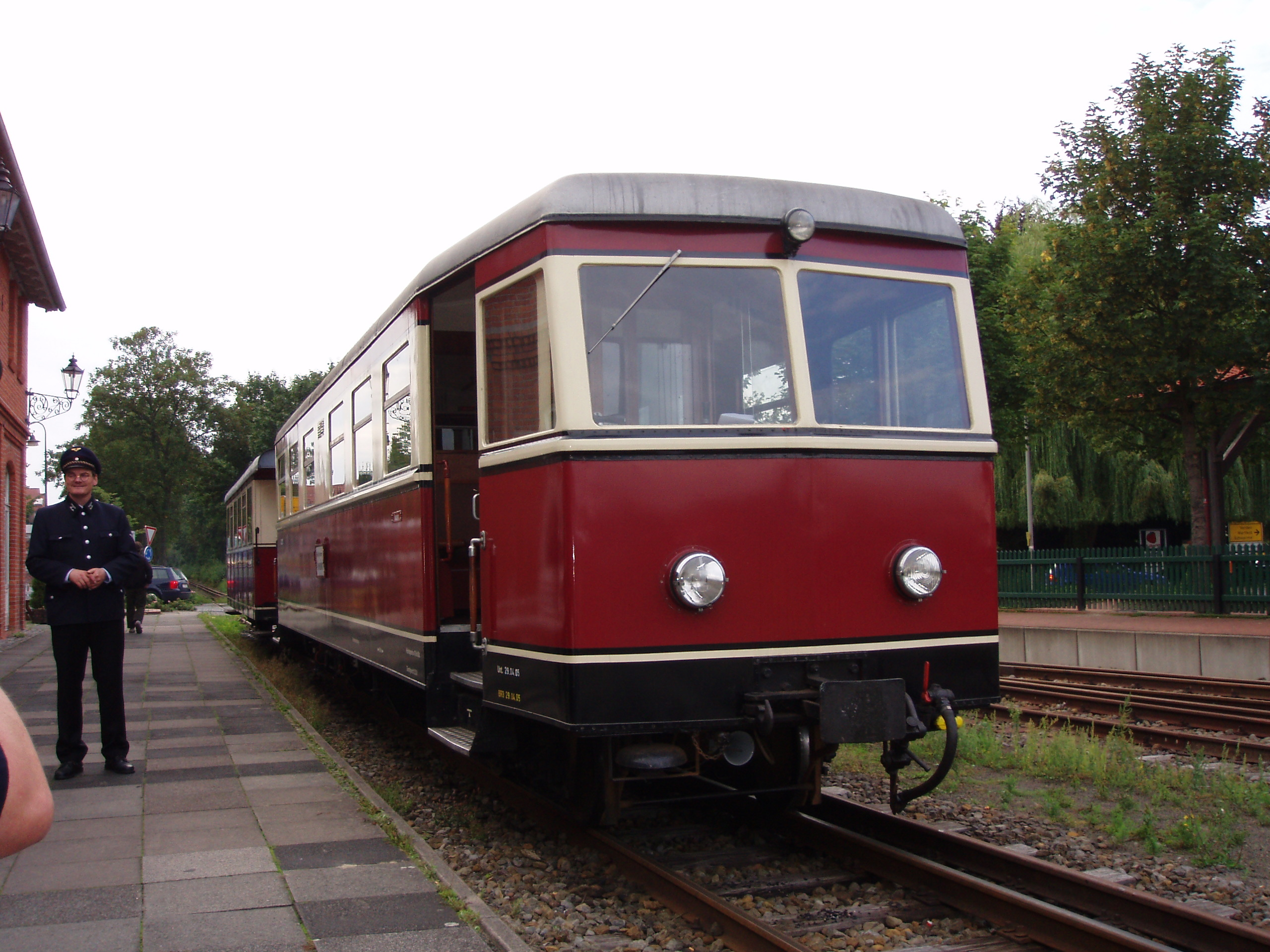
Railcar T 44 pulling passenger car No. 2

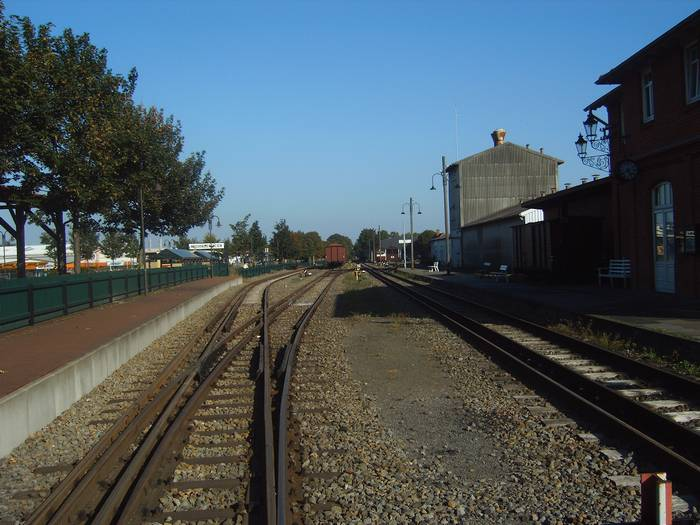
Bruchhausen-Vilsen station

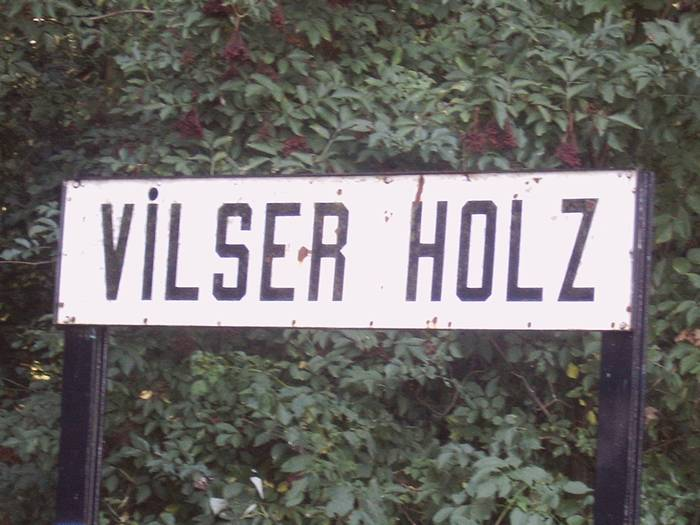
"Vilser Holz" stop

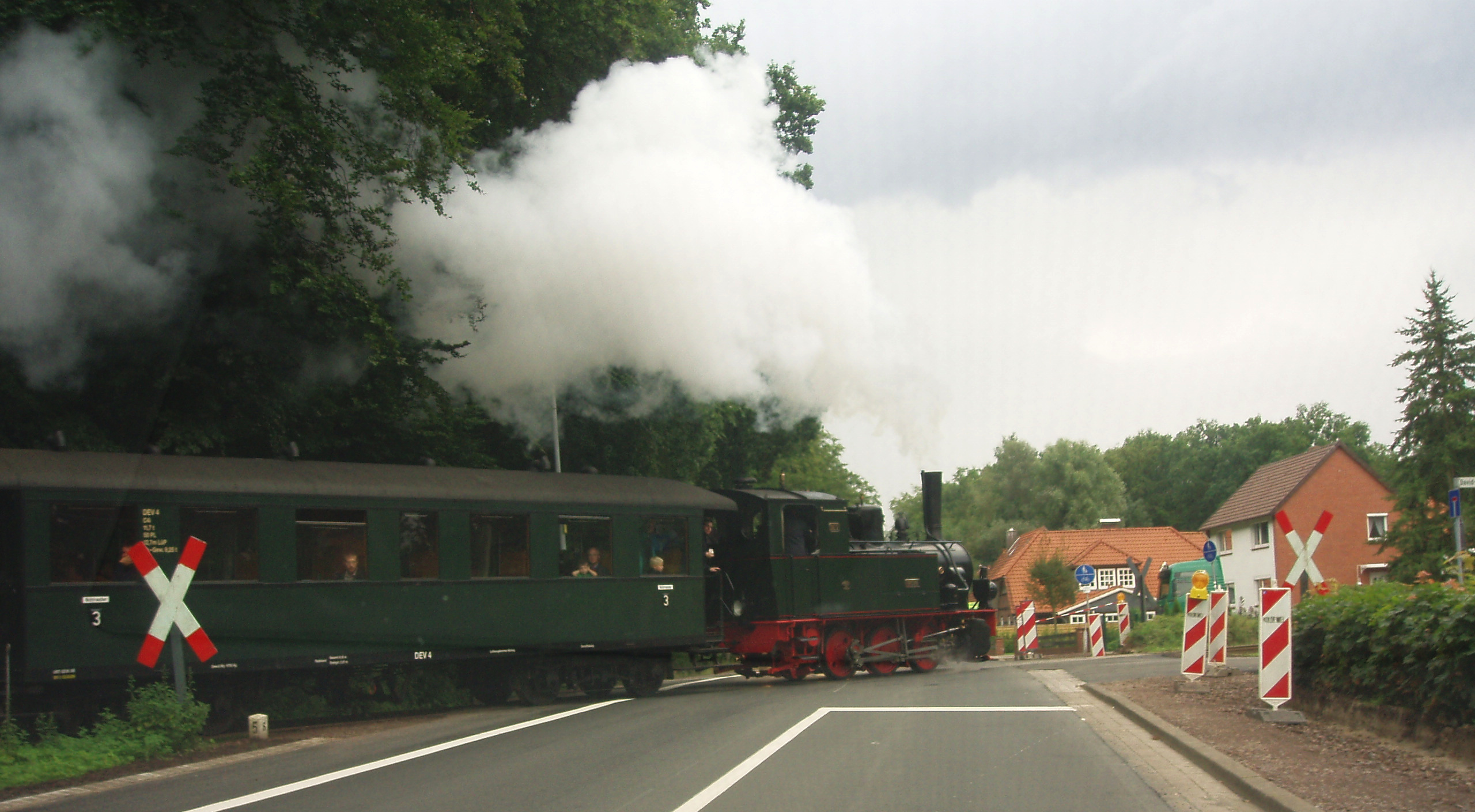
The railway crosses Homfelder Street

=== Borgward service ===
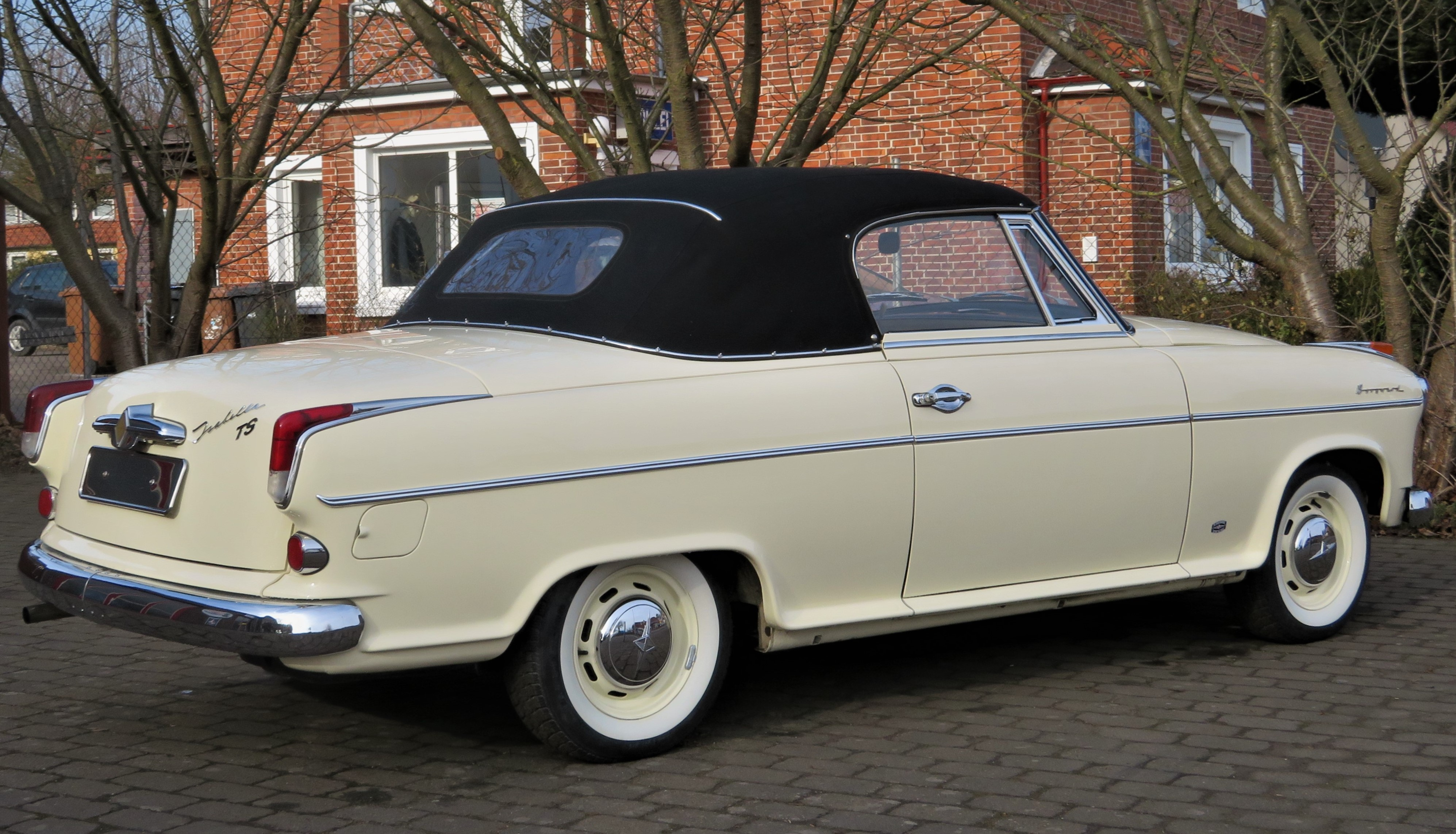
Borgward Isabella at Europe's only remaining Borgward service centre

The little town is home to what is claimed to be the world's only surviving Borgward garage/service centre, operated by a father-and-son team of enthusiasts. Borgward was an automobile manufacturer, based in nearby Bremen, which ceased trading under controversial circumstances in 1961, but the cars, notably the Isabella model became an iconic symbol of Germany's economic miracle, and continue to generate passion, even though only between 2,000 and 3,000 Borgwards are now (2014) thought to survive worldwide. The Borgward service centre in Bruchhausen-Vilsen operates from premises that consciously hark back Borgward's own glory days in the 1950s. The business claims to have 70 regular customers and is proud to use "experience in place of a computer driven diagnostic centre", pointing out that a lot of mechanical diagnosis can be done simply by listening to the noise from the engine ("Vieles kann man schon am Motorengeräusch hören").

=== Structures ===
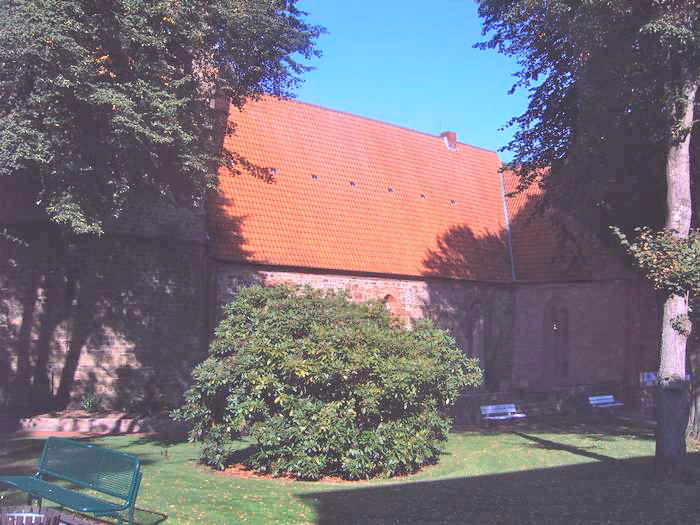
St. Cyriakus Church: Church forecourt

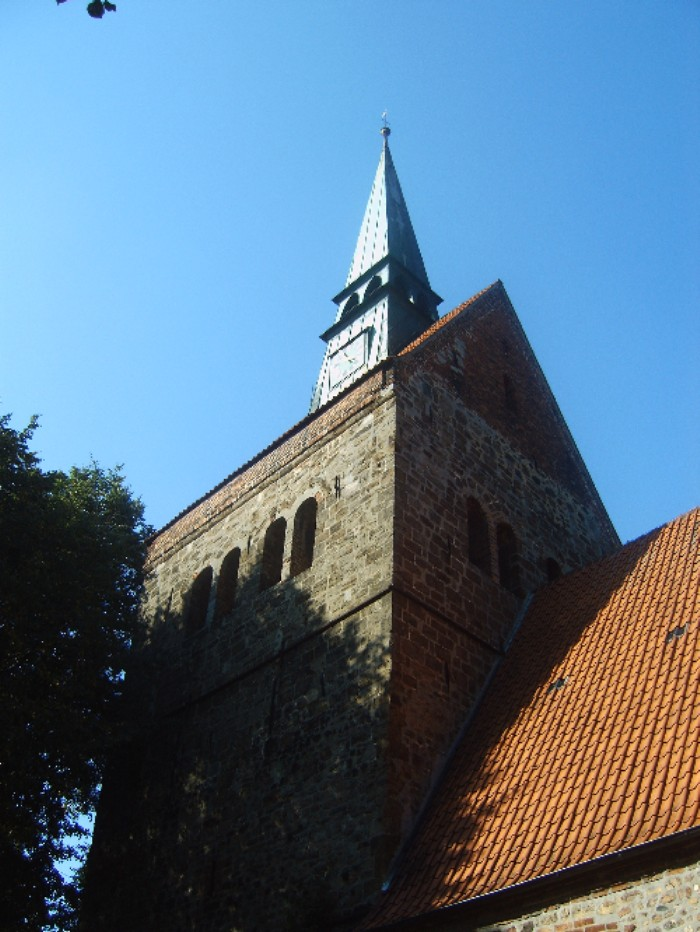
St. Cyriakus Church: Bell tower and steeple

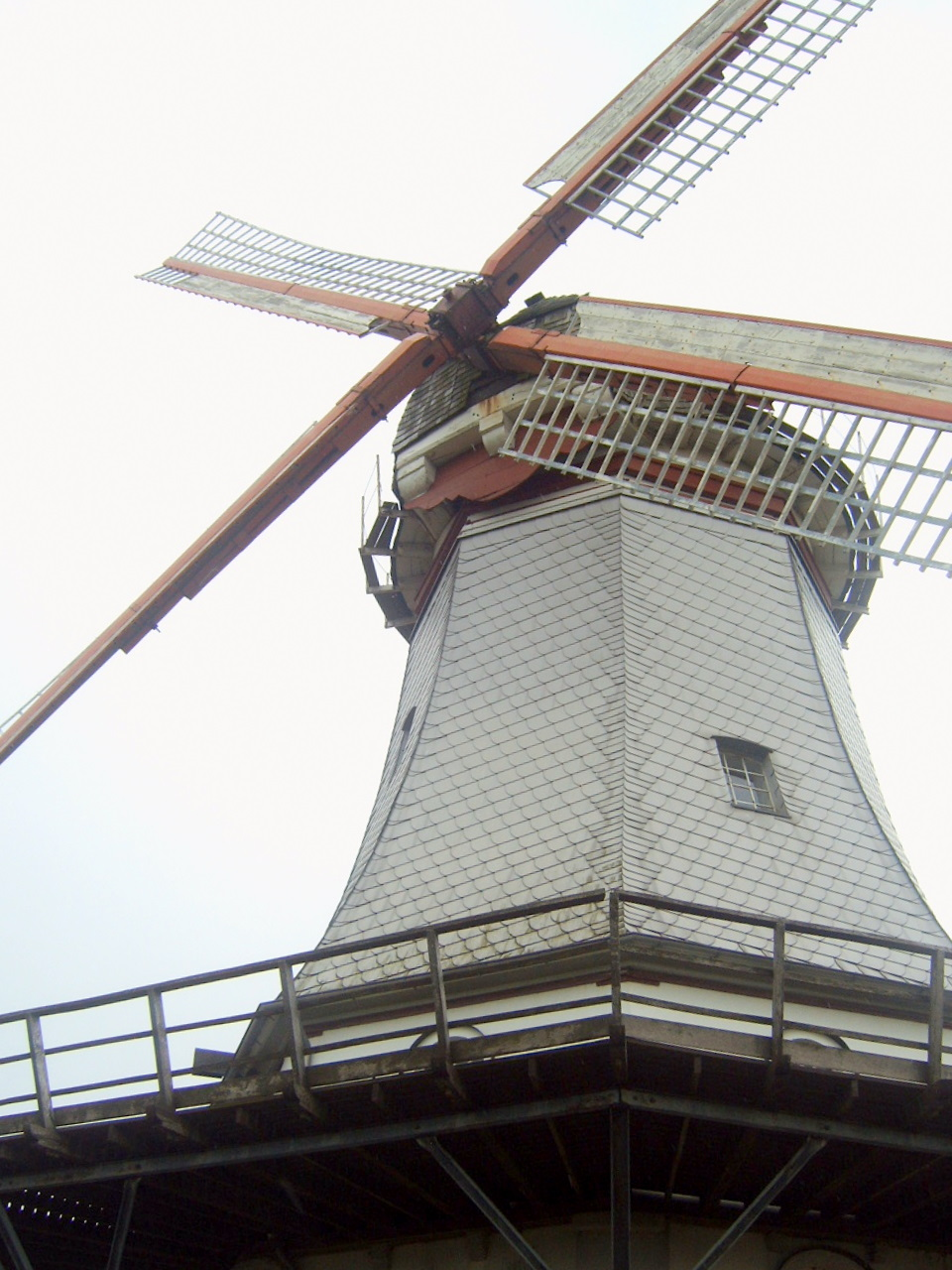
Behlmer mill

==== Churches ====
St. Cyriakus Church in Vilsen is a Romanesque-style church. It was first mentioned in 1227 and belonged to the Heiligenberg monastery. It is a Protestant church today.

St. Bartholomew Church in Bruchhausen was completed in 1901. In the steeple hangs a bronze bell that was cast during the Thirty Years War (1618–1648) and was used in the previous church for over 200 years.

==== Mills ====
Behlmer Mill: The Behlmer mill is an octagonal two-story structure in the Dutch-style, built in 1876 by the master miller Heusmann. In 1934 it was rebuilt after being severely damaged by a tornado and in 1988, the mill was completely renovated. In addition to the mill are a loom and other farm equipment open to the public.

Martfeld Mill: The Martfeld mill was first mentioned in the year 1583. Originally built as a block windmill, in 1840 it was rebuilt in three story Dutch-style. The mill burned to the ground after a lightning strike in 1851 and was rebuilt the same year. Between 1992 and 1999 the mill was completely renovated. The mill is the oldest windmill in the area.

Fehsenfeldsche Mill: Built in 1871 in the three-story Dutch style, the mill operated until 1971. In 1991 the mill was restored and is now used for weddings.

Sprakener Windmill: The Sprakener windmill was erected in 1856 in the three-story Dutch style and was in commercial operation until 1960. An exterior restoration was accomplished between 1991 and 1994, and there are plans to renovate the interior in the coming years.

Heiligenberg Monastery Mill: First mention in 1370, the mill and the monastery came under state ownership in 1543. In 1986 the mill was restored and construction in 1996 opened a restaurant and a hotel with a gallery space in the mill.

Bruchmühlen Watermill: The Bruchmühlen Watermill was the lower mill of the Heiligenberg Monastery. It is located a few hundred meters from the upper mill. Mentioned for the first time in the year 1532, creation of a massive ground work and the repair of the mill house was undertaken in 1749. Since 1886 the mill has been privately owned by the Hüneke family. Water was restored to the mill in 1990/1991, and starting in the spring of 1996, roughly three tons per day of cereal was being ground.

Noltesche mill: The Noltesche mill at Süstedter Bach was built as a grain mill in 1880, and three years later equipped with a turbine. In 1997 the mill became the property of the Süstedt municipality and restoration was completed in 1999. Since 1998, the turbine has been used for power generation.
