= Süstedt =

- Ortsteil of Bruchhausen-Vilsen
- Interactive map of Süstedt
- Location within Germany Location within Lower Saxony
- Coordinates: 52°51′42″N 8°55′14″E
- Country: Germany
- State: Lower Saxony
- District: Diepholz
- Municipality: Bruchhausen-Vilsen
- Subdivisions: 3

Area
  - Total: 37.01 km^{2} (14.29 sq mi)
- Elevation: 14 m (46 ft)

Population (2015-12-31)
  - Total: 1,559
  - Density: 42.12/km^{2} (109.1/sq mi)
- Time zone: UTC+01:00 (CET)
  - Summer (DST): UTC+02:00 (CEST)
- Postal codes: 27305
- Dialling codes: 04240
- Vehicle registration: DH
- Website: www.suestedt.de

Süstedt is a village and a former municipality in the district of Diepholz, in Lower Saxony, Germany. Since 1 November 2016, it is part of the municipality Bruchhausen-Vilsen.
