= Miles B. Wachendorf =

Miles Benton Wachendorf
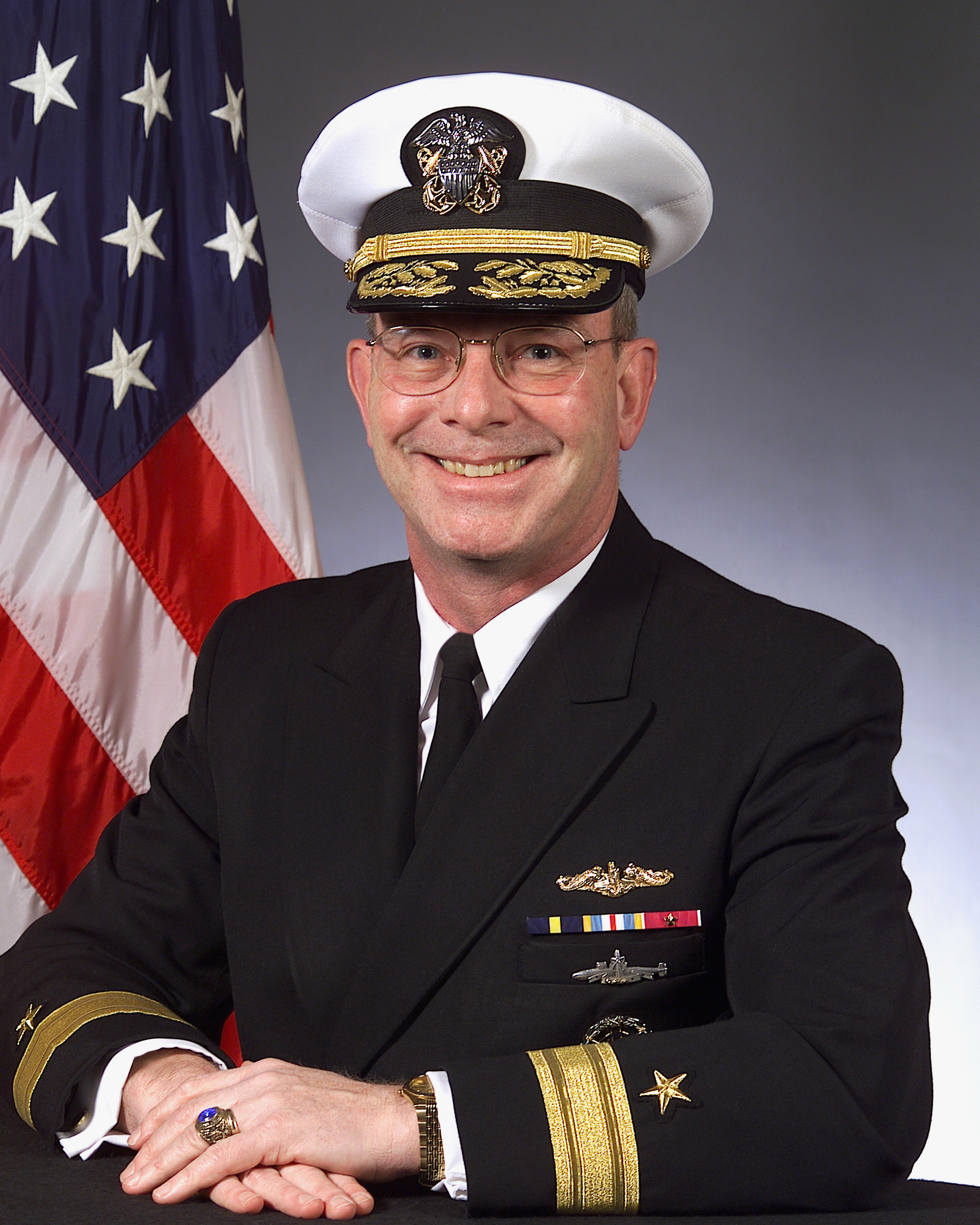
- Born: September 21, 1952 (age 74); Cincinnati, Ohio, U.S.
- Alma mater: United States Naval Academy; University of Zurich; Catholic University of America; Harvard University; Naval War College
- Military career
- Allegiance: United States
- Branch: United States Navy
- Rank: Rear Admiral

Miles Benton "Ben" Wachendorf (born 1952 in Cincinnati, Ohio) is a retired Rear Admiral in the United States Navy.

== Education and Family ==
Wachendorf graduated with distinction from U.S. Naval Academy in 1974 with majors in mathematics and Soviet Area Studies-Russian. He later went on to study international relations in the German language as an Olmsted Scholar at the University of Zurich, received a master of science in engineering degree from the Catholic University, attended the Senior Officials in National Security program at Harvard University, and graduated from the senior officer course at the Naval War College.

== Naval career ==
He has served afloat on both nuclear powered attack and strategic missile submarines of the Atlantic and Pacific Fleets including command of the submarine Parche (SSN-683). He also commanded Submarine Development Squadron Five in San Diego, California.

Wachendorf's shore assignments included deputy assistant for Chief of Naval Operation/Vice Chief of Naval Operations decision coordination, branch head for anti-submarine warfare, chief of the Joint Staff's nuclear/counter-proliferation division.

He has also served as executive assistant to the Joint Staff director of strategic plans and policy (J-5), and director of the OPNAV Strategy and Policy Division (N51) and U.S. defense attaché to Russia. Promoted to two stars, while serving in Russia, Wachendorf's final assignment on active duty was as Chief of Staff, Joint Forces Command, 2006–2008, when he was responsible for managing the command's warfighting initiatives and providing guidance to the command's executive staff on day-to-day matters. Additionally, he supervised all of the command's administrative issues.

== Post-Naval Career ==
After retirement from the Navy, Wachendorf became Chief Operating Officer of EchoStorm Worldwide, LLC in Suffolk, Virginia.
