= Künsebeck station =

Railway station in Northern Rhine - Westfalia, Germany

Künsebeck
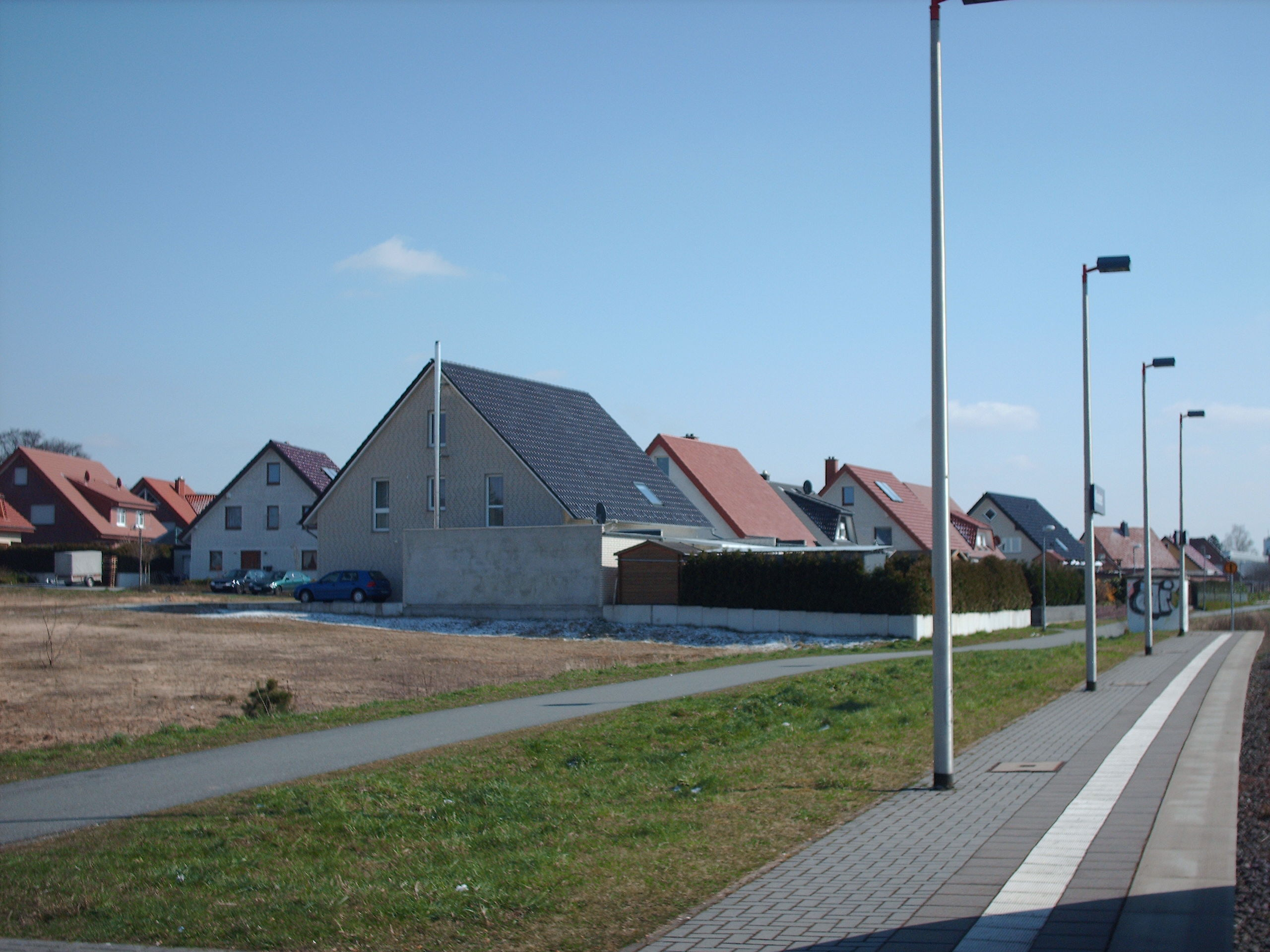

General information
- Location: Halle, NRW; Germany
- Coordinates: 52°02′12″N 8°23′04″E
- Line: Osnabrück–Brackwede (KBS 402)
- Platforms: 1

Construction
- Accessible: Yes

Other information
- Station code: 3463
- DS100 code: EKUE
- Category: 6
- Fare zone: Westfalentarif: 60721; VOS: Der Sechser (Westfalentarif transitional tariff)
- Website: www.bahnhof.de

History
- Opened: 22 July 1889

Services
Preceding station	NordWestBahn	Following station
Halle (Westf) towards Osnabrück Hbf	RB 75	Steinhagen towards Bielefeld Hbf
Location

Künsebeck is a railway station located in Künsebeck, Germany. The station is on the Osnabrück–Brackwede railway. The train services are operated by NordWestBahn.

== Train services ==
The following services currently call at Künsebeck:

Series	Train Type	Route	Material	Frequency	Notes
RB 75	NordWestBahn	Osnabrück Hbf - Osnabrück-Sutthausen - Oesede - Kloster Oesede - Wellendorf - Hilter - Dissen-Bad Rothenfelde - Westbarthausen - Borgholzhausen - Hesseln - Halle Gerry-Weber-Stadion - Halle (Westf) - Künsebeck - Steinhagen - Steinhagen Bielefelder Straße - Quelle - Quelle-Kupferheide - Brackwede – Bielefeld Hbf	Bombardier Talent	1x per hour	Haller Willem
