= Halle OWL-Arena station =

Railway station in Northern Rhein - Westfalia, Germany

Halle (Westf) OWL-Arena
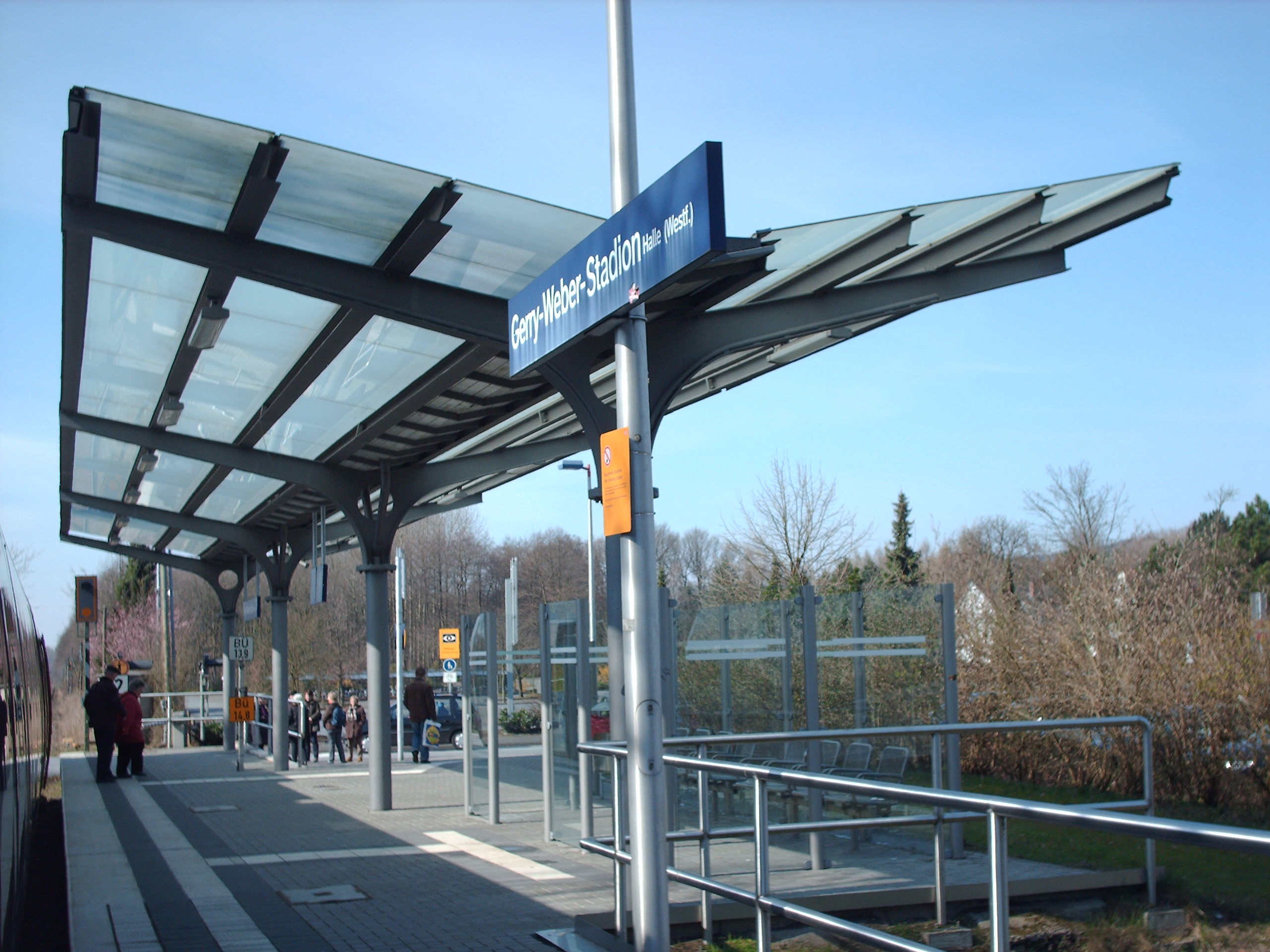

General information
- Location: Halle, NRW; Germany
- Coordinates: 52°03′42″N 8°20′36″E
- Owner: DB Netz
- Operator: DB Station&Service
- Line: Osnabrück–Brackwede railway (KBS 402)
- Platforms: 1 side platform
- Tracks: 1
- Train operators: NordWestBahn

Construction
- Accessible: Yes

Other information
- Station code: 7772
- DS100 code: EHWS
- Category: 6
- Fare zone: Westfalentarif: 60711; VOS: Der Sechser (Westfalentarif transitional tariff)
- Website: www.bahnhof.de

History
- Opened: 1 June 1997

Services
Preceding station	NordWestBahn	Following station
Hesseln towards Osnabrück Hbf	RB 75	Halle (Westf) towards Bielefeld Hbf
Location
- Location within North Rhine-Westphalia

Halle OWL-Arena is a railway station located in Halle, Germany. The station is on the Osnabrück–Brackwede railway. The train services are operated by NordWestBahn. The station lies approx. 500m from the Heristo Arena, a stadium for sports and concerts.

== Train services ==
The following services currently call at Halle OWL-Arena:

- RB75 between Bielefeld Hauptbahnhof and Osnabrück Hauptbahnhof

Series	Train Type	Route	Material	Frequency	Notes
RB 75	NordWestBahn	Osnabrück Hbf - Osnabrück-Sutthausen - Oesede - Kloster Oesede - Wellendorf - Hilter - Dissen-Bad Rothenfelde - Westbarthausen - Borgholzhausen - Hesseln - Halle OWL-Arena - Halle (Westf) - Künsebeck - Steinhagen - Steinhagen Bielefelder Straße - Quelle - Quelle-Kupferheide - Brackwede – Bielefeld Hbf	Bombardier Talent	1x per hour	Haller Willem
