= Steinhagen Bielefelder Straße station =

Railway station in Northern Rhein - Westfalia, Germany

Steinhagen Bielefelder Straße
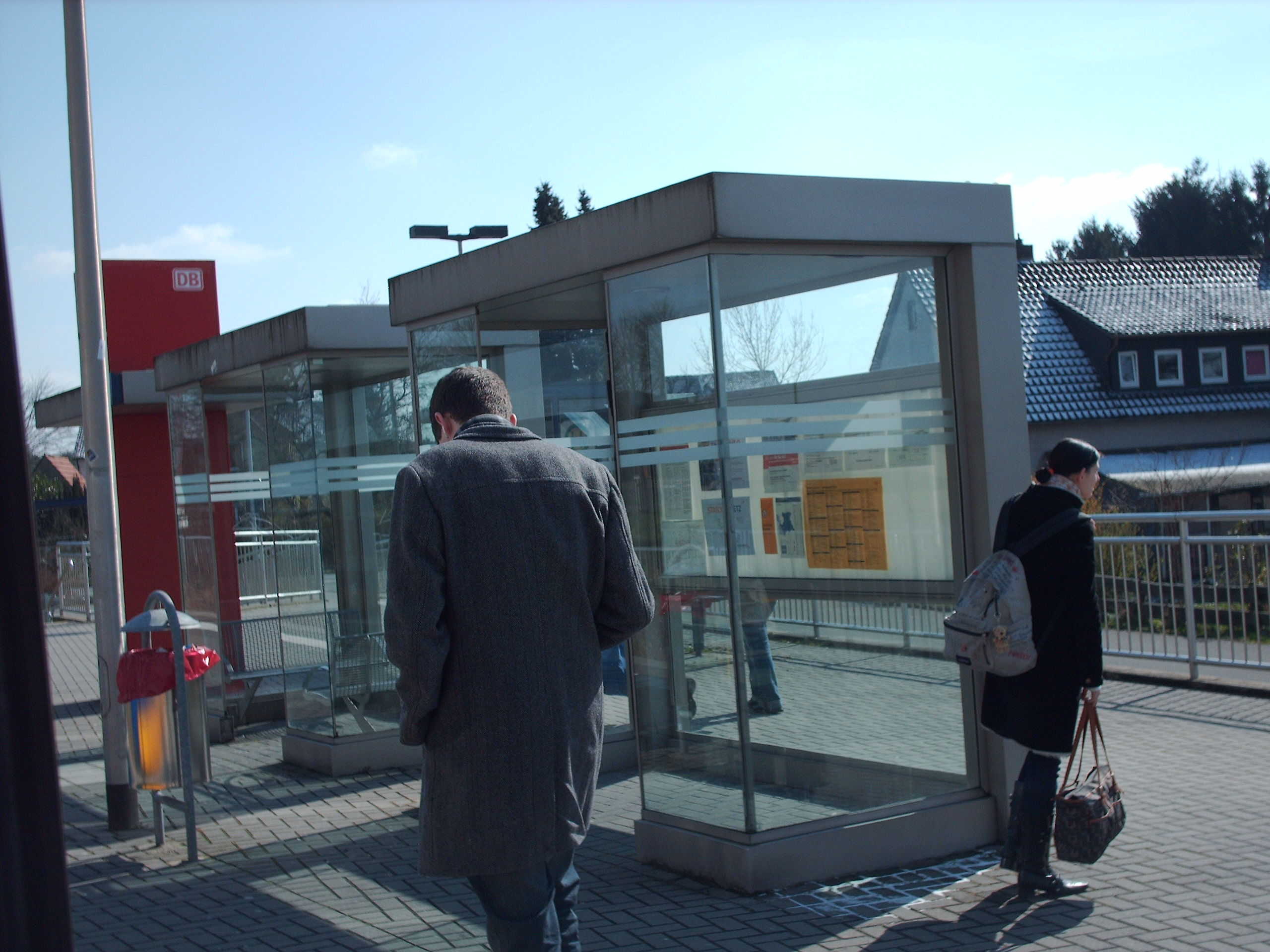

General information
- Location: Steinhagen, NRW; Germany
- Coordinates: 52°00′41″N 8°26′10″E
- Line: Osnabrück–Brackwede railway (KBS 402)
- Platforms: 1

Other information
- Station code: 3030
- DS100 code: ESBS
- Category: 6
- Fare zone: Westfalentarif: 61411; VOS: Der Sechser (Westfalentarif transitional tariff)
- Website: www.bahnhof.de

History
- Opened: 2000

Services
Preceding station	NordWestBahn	Following station
Steinhagen towards Osnabrück Hbf	RB 75	Quelle towards Bielefeld Hbf
Location

Steinhagen Bielefelder Straße is a railway station located in Steinhagen, Germany. The station is on the Osnabrück–Brackwede railway. The train services are operated by NordWestBahn.

== Train services ==
The following services currently call at Steinhagen Bielefelder Straße:

Series	Train Type	Route	Material	Frequency	Notes
RB 75	NordWestBahn	Osnabrück Hbf–Osnabrück-Sutthausen–Oesede–Kloster Oesede–Wellendorf–Hilter–Dissen-Bad Rothenfelde–Westbarthausen–Borgholzhausen–Hesseln–Halle Gerry-Weber-Stadion–Halle (Westf)–Künsebeck–Steinhagen–Steinhagen Bielefelder Straße–Quelle–Quelle-Kupferheide–Brackwede–Bielefeld Hbf	Bombardier Talent	1x per hour	Haller Willem
