= Borgholzhausen station =

Railway station in North Rhine-Westphalia, Germany

Borgholzhausen
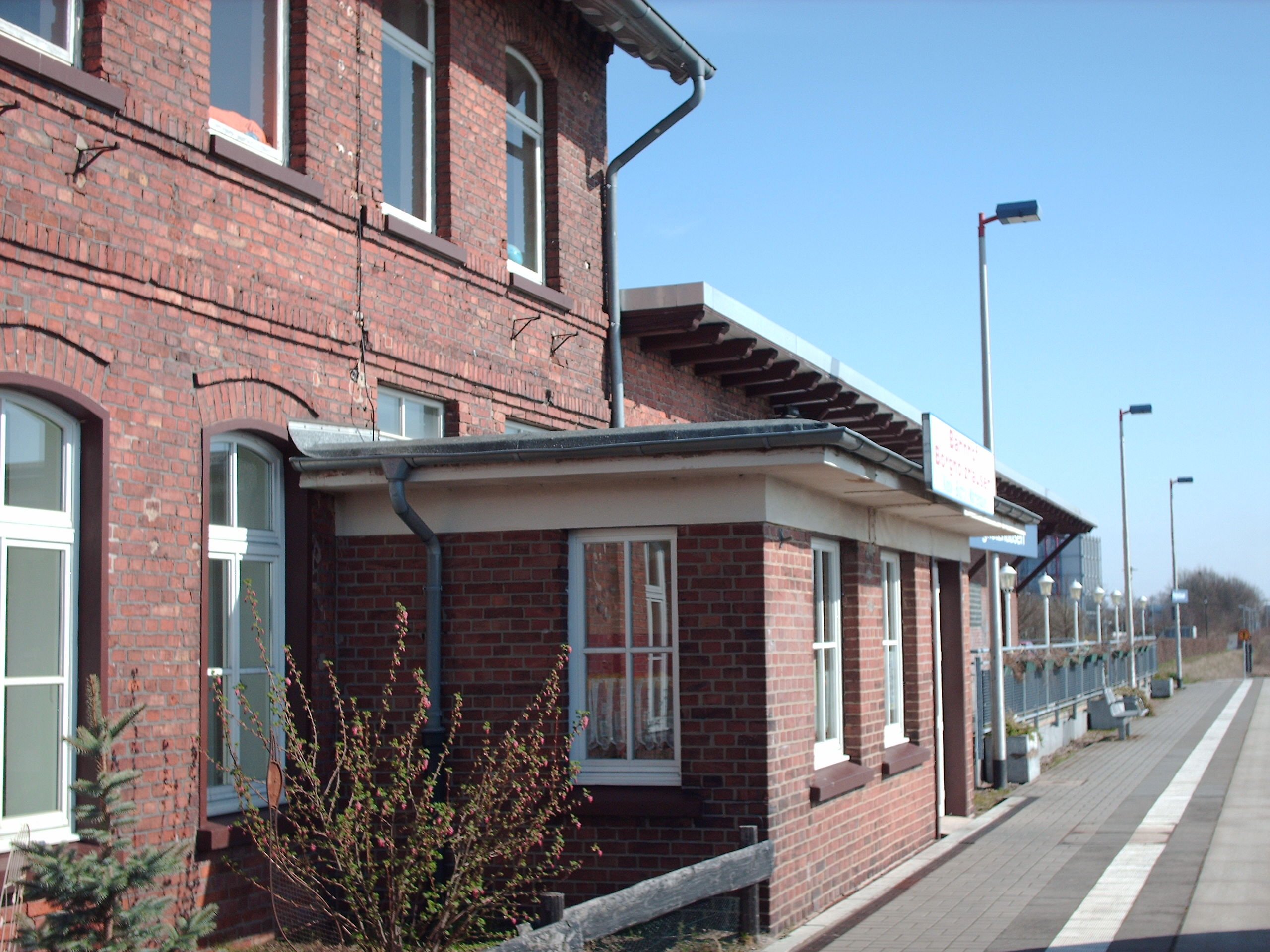

General information
- Location: Borgholzhausen, NRW; Germany
- Coordinates: 52°05′07″N 8°16′01″E
- Line: Osnabrück–Brackwede railway (KBS 402)
- Platforms: 1

Construction
- Accessible: Yes

Other information
- Station code: 780
- DS100 code: EBHS
- Category: 7
- Fare zone: Westfalentarif: 60641; VOS: Der Sechser (Westfalentarif transitional tariff)
- Website: www.bahnhof.de

History
- Opened: 15 August 1886

Services
Preceding station	NordWestBahn	Following station
Westbarthausen towards Osnabrück Hbf	RB 75	Hesseln towards Bielefeld Hbf
Location

Borgholzhausen is a railway station located 3 km south west of Borgholzhausen, Germany. The station is on the Osnabrück–Brackwede railway. The train services are operated by NordWestBahn.

== Train services ==
The following services currently call at Borgholzhausen:

Series	Train Type	Route	Material	Frequency	Notes
RB 75	NordWestBahn	Osnabrück Hbf - Osnabrück-Sutthausen - Oesede - Kloster Oesede - Wellendorf - Hilter - Dissen-Bad Rothenfelde - Westbarthausen - Borgholzhausen - Hesseln - Halle Gerry-Weber-Stadion - Halle (Westf) - Künsebeck - Steinhagen - Steinhagen Bielefelder Straße - Quelle - Quelle-Kupferheide - Brackwede – Bielefeld Hbf	Bombardier Talent	1x per hour	Haller Willem
