= Hesseln station =

Railway station in Germany

Hesseln
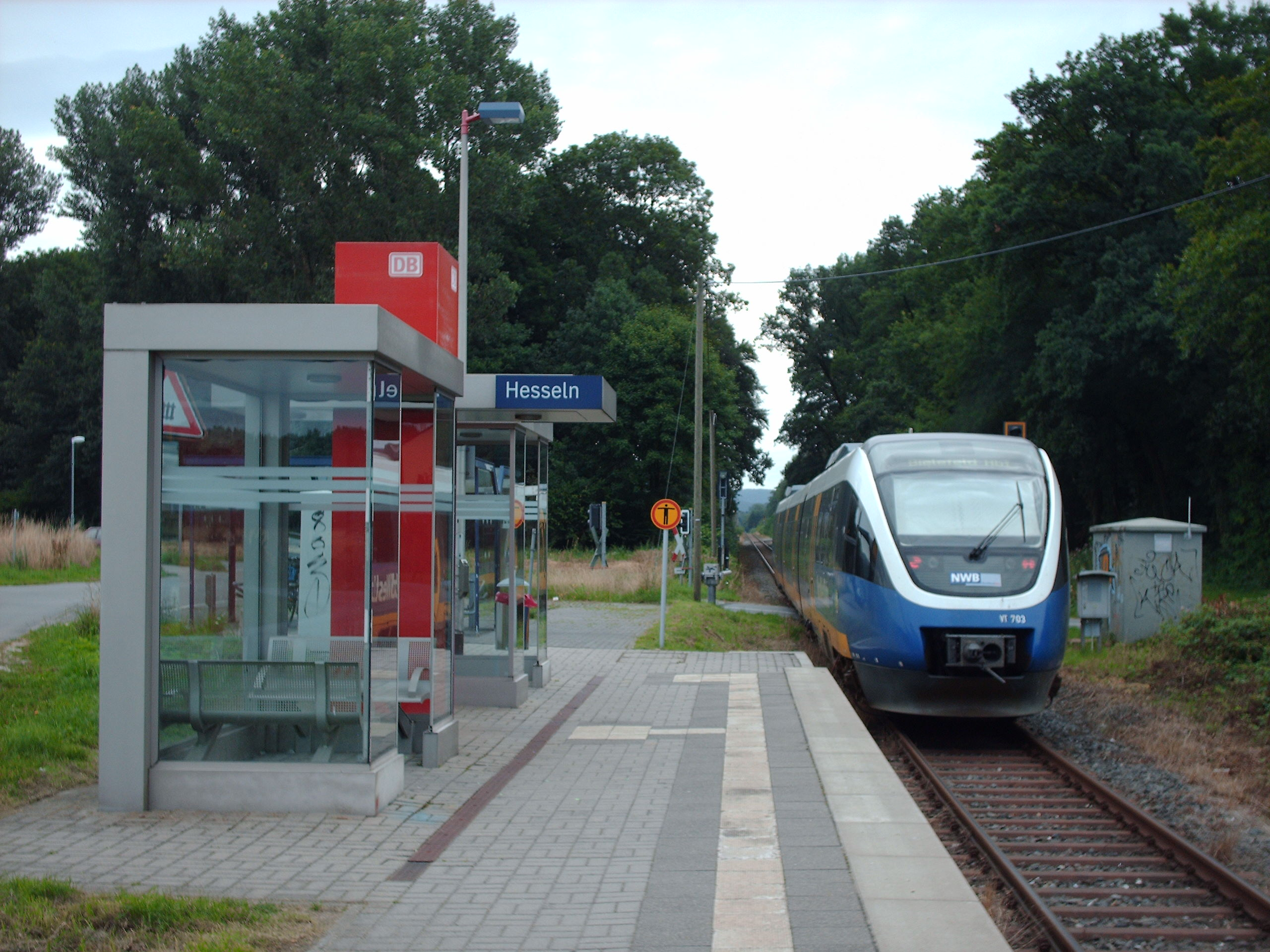
- Hesseln station

General information
- Location: Hesseln, NRW; Germany
- Coordinates: 52°04′07″N 8°18′42″E
- Line: Osnabrück–Brackwede railway
- Platforms: 1
- Tracks: 1

Construction
- Accessible: Yes

Other information
- Fare zone: Westfalentarif: 60741; VOS: Der Sechser (Westfalentarif transitional tariff)
- Website: www.bahnhof.de

Services
Preceding station	NordWestBahn	Following station
Borgholzhausen towards Osnabrück Hbf	RB 75	Halle Gerry-Weber-Stadion towards Bielefeld Hbf
Location

Hesseln is a railway station located in Hesseln, Germany. The station is on the Osnabrück–Brackwede railway. The train services are operated by NordWestBahn.

== Train services ==
The following services currently call at Hesseln:

Series	Train type	Route	Material	Frequency	Notes
RB 75	NordWestBahn	Osnabrück Hbf - Osnabrück-Sutthausen - Oesede - Kloster Oesede - Wellendorf - Hilter - Dissen-Bad Rothenfelde - Westbarthausen - Borgholzhausen - Hesseln - Halle Gerry-Weber-Stadion - Halle (Westf) - Künsebeck - Steinhagen - Steinhagen Bielefelder Straße - Quelle - Quelle-Kupferheide - Brackwede – Bielefeld Hbf	Bombardier Talent	1x per hour	Haller Willem
