= Steinhagen station =

Railway station in Germany

Steinhagen
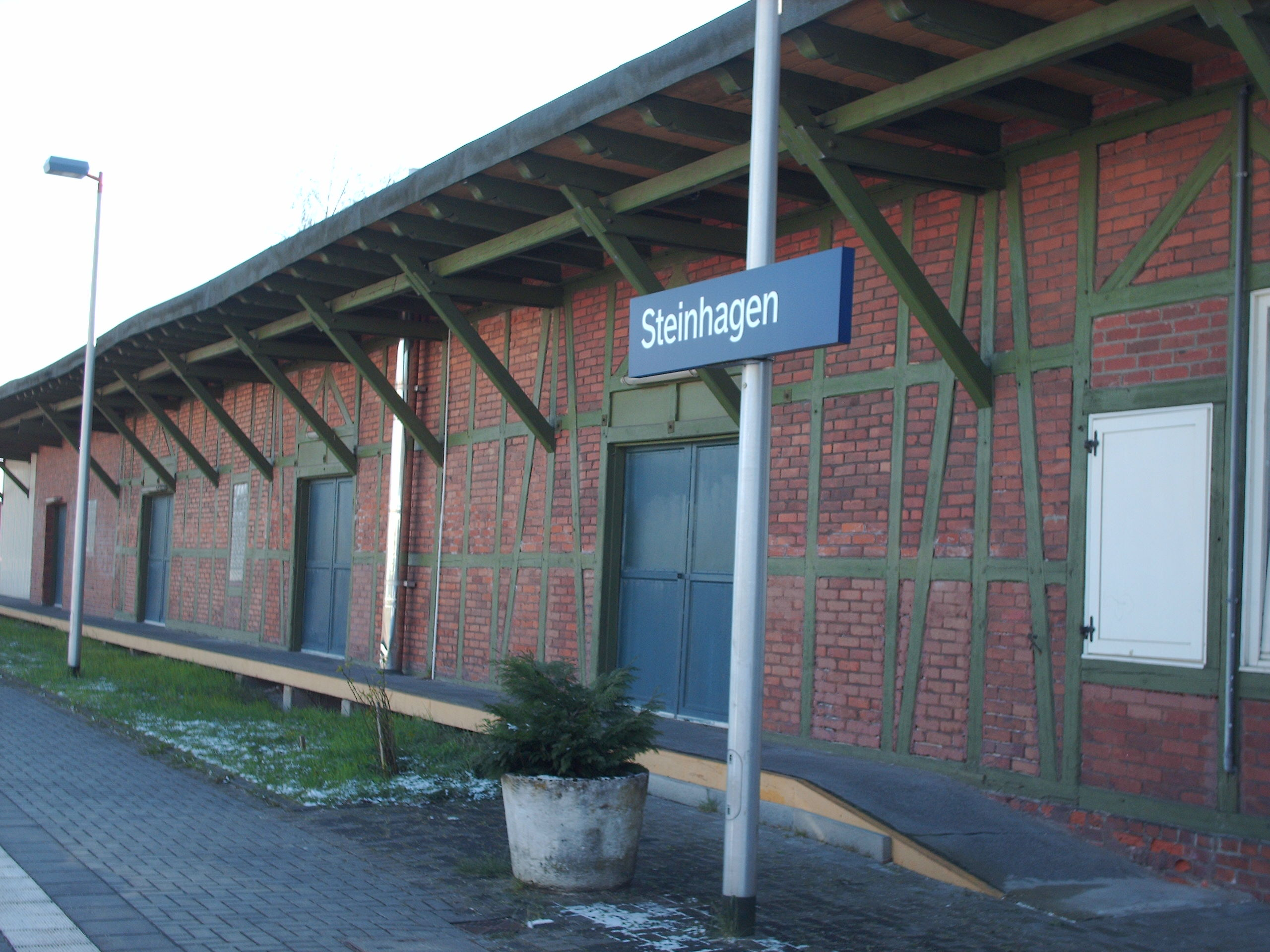

General information
- Location: Steinhagen, NRW; Germany
- Coordinates: 52°01′03″N 8°25′15″E
- Line: Osnabrück–Brackwede railway (KBS 402)
- Platforms: 1

Other information
- Station code: 5996
- DS100 code: ESTG
- Category: 6
- Fare zone: Westfalentarif: 61411; VOS: Der Sechser (Westfalentarif transitional tariff)
- Website: www.bahnhof.de

History
- Opened: 15 August 1886

Services
Preceding station	NordWestBahn	Following station
Künsebeck towards Osnabrück Hbf	RB 75	Steinhagen Bielefeldstrasse towards Bielefeld Hbf
Location

Steinhagen is a railway station located in Steinhagen, Germany. The station is on the Osnabrück–Brackwede railway. The train services are operated by NordWestBahn.

== Train services ==
The following services currently call at Steinhagen:

Series	Train Type	Route	Material	Frequency	Notes
RB 75	NordWestBahn	Osnabrück Hbf - Osnabrück-Sutthausen - Oesede - Kloster Oesede - Wellendorf - Hilter - Dissen-Bad Rothenfelde - Westbarthausen - Borgholzhausen - Hesseln - Halle Gerry-Weber-Stadion - Halle (Westf) - Künsebeck - Steinhagen - Steinhagen Bielefeldstrasse - Quelle - Quelle-Kupferheide - Brackwede – Bielefeld Hbf	Bombardier Talent	1x per hour	Haller Willem
