= Westbarthausen station =

Railway station in Germany

Westbarthausen
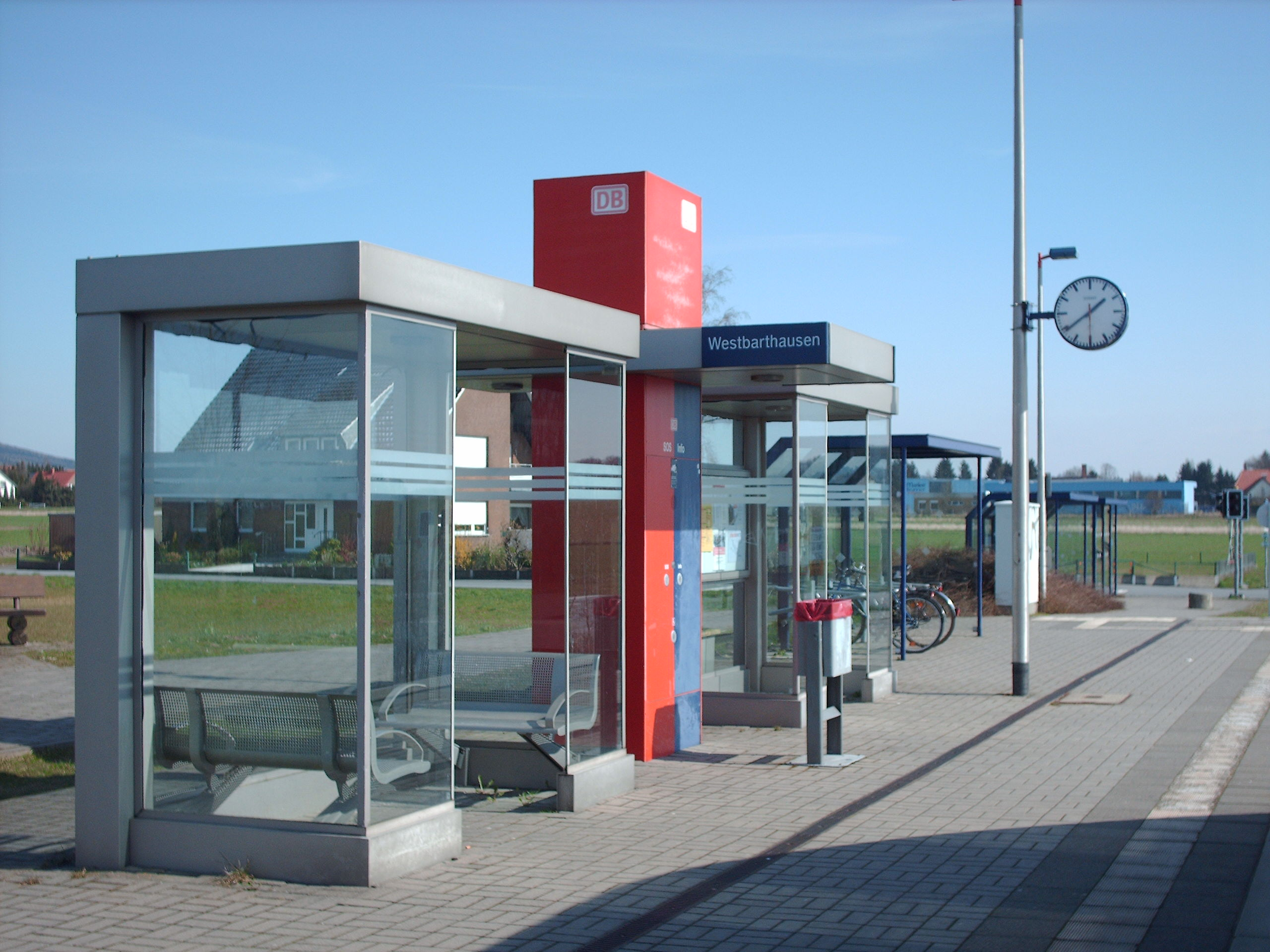

General information
- Location: Borgholzhausen, NRW; Germany
- Coordinates: 52°05′49″N 8°13′58″E
- Line: Osnabrück–Brackwede (KBS 402)
- Platforms: 1

Construction
- Accessible: Yes

Other information
- Station code: 6706
- DS100 code: EWBH
- Category: 7
- Fare zone: Westfalentarif: 60651; VOS: Der Sechser (Westfalentarif transitional tariff)
- Website: www.bahnhof.de

History
- Opened: 8 January 1888

Services
Preceding station	NordWestBahn	Following station
Dissen-Bad Rothenfelde towards Osnabrück Hbf	RB 75	Borgholzhausen towards Bielefeld Hbf
Location

Westbarthausen is a railway station located in Borgholzhausen, Germany. The station is on the Osnabrück–Brackwede railway. The train services are operated by NordWestBahn.

== Train services ==
The following services currently call at Westbarthausen:

Series	Train Type	Route	Material	Frequency	Notes
RB 75	NordWestBahn	Osnabrück Hbf - Osnabrück-Sutthausen - Oesede - Kloster Oesede - Wellendorf - Hilter - Dissen-Bad Rothenfelde - Westbarthausen - Borgholzhausen - Hesseln - Halle Gerry-Weber-Stadion - Halle (Westf) - Künsebeck - Steinhagen - Steinhagen Bielefeldstrasse - Quelle - Quelle-Kupferheide - Brackwede – Bielefeld Hbf	Bombardier Talent	1x per hour	Haller Willem
