= Quelle station =

Railway station in Germany

Quelle
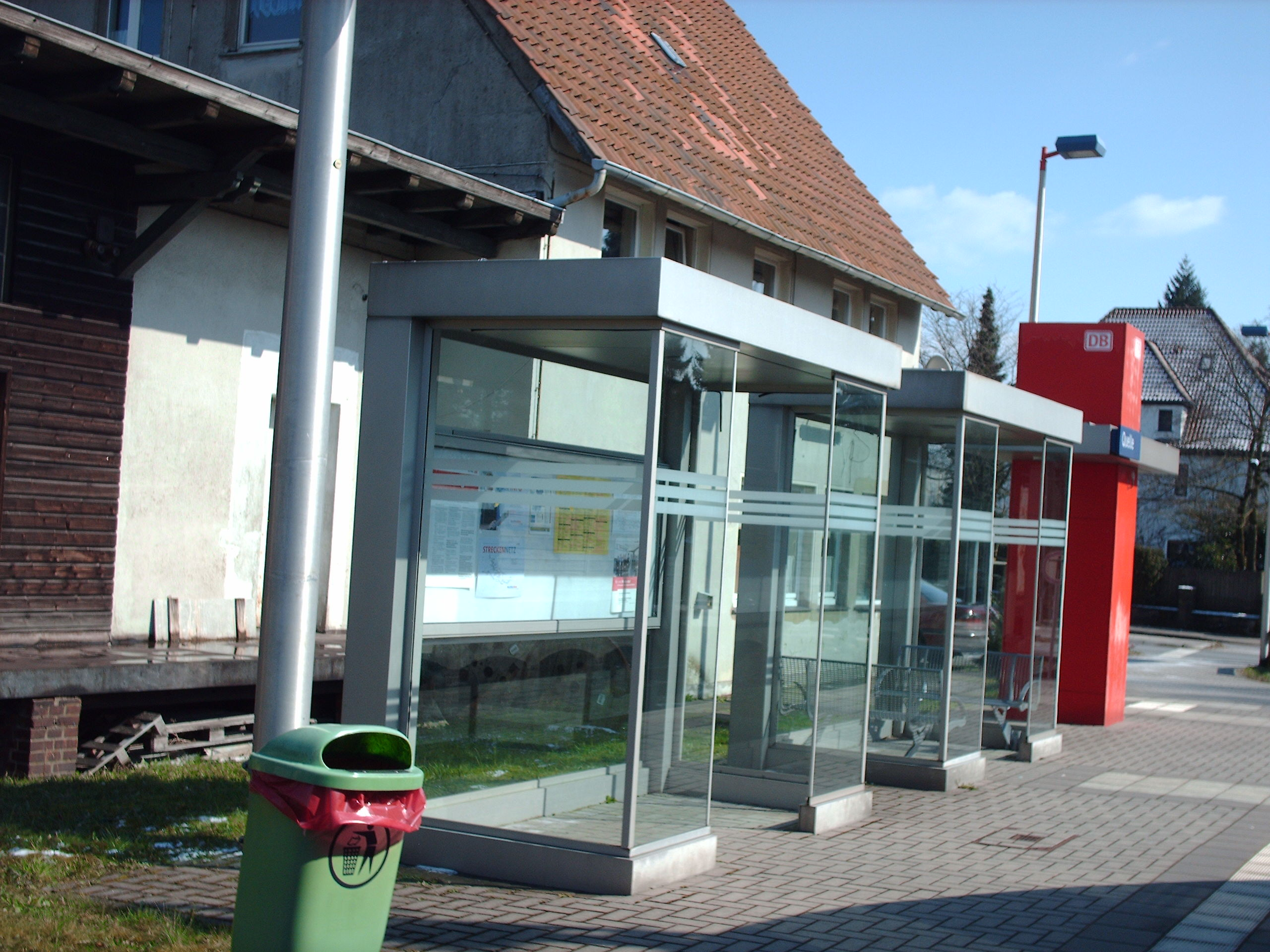

General information
- Location: Bielefeld, NRW; Germany
- Coordinates: 52°00′02″N 8°27′40″E
- Line: Osnabrück–Brackwede railway (KBS 402)
- Platforms: 1

Construction
- Accessible: Yes

Other information
- Station code: 5070
- DS100 code: EQL
- Category: 6
- Fare zone: Westfalentarif: 60131; VOS: Der Sechser (VOS transitional tariff)
- Website: www.bahnhof.de

History
- Opened: 15 November 1896

Services
Preceding station	NordWestBahn	Following station
Steinhagen Bielefeldstrasse towards Osnabrück Hbf	RB 75	Quelle-Kupferheide towards Bielefeld Hbf
Location

Quelle is a railway station located in Bielefeld, Germany. The station is on the Osnabrück–Brackwede railway. The train services are operated by NordWestBahn.

== Train services ==
The following services currently call at Quelle:

Series	Train Type	Route	Material	Frequency	Notes
RB 75	NordWestBahn	Osnabrück Hbf - Osnabrück-Sutthausen - Oesede - Kloster Oesede - Wellendorf - Hilter - Dissen-Bad Rothenfelde - Westbarthausen - Borgholzhausen - Hesseln - Halle Gerry-Weber-Stadion - Halle (Westf) - Künsebeck - Steinhagen - Steinhagen Bielefeldstrasse - Quelle - Quelle-Kupferheide - Brackwede – Bielefeld Hbf	Bombardier Talent	1x per hour	Haller Willem
