= Halle (Westf) station =

Railway station in Northern Rhine - Westfalia, Germany

Halle (Westf)
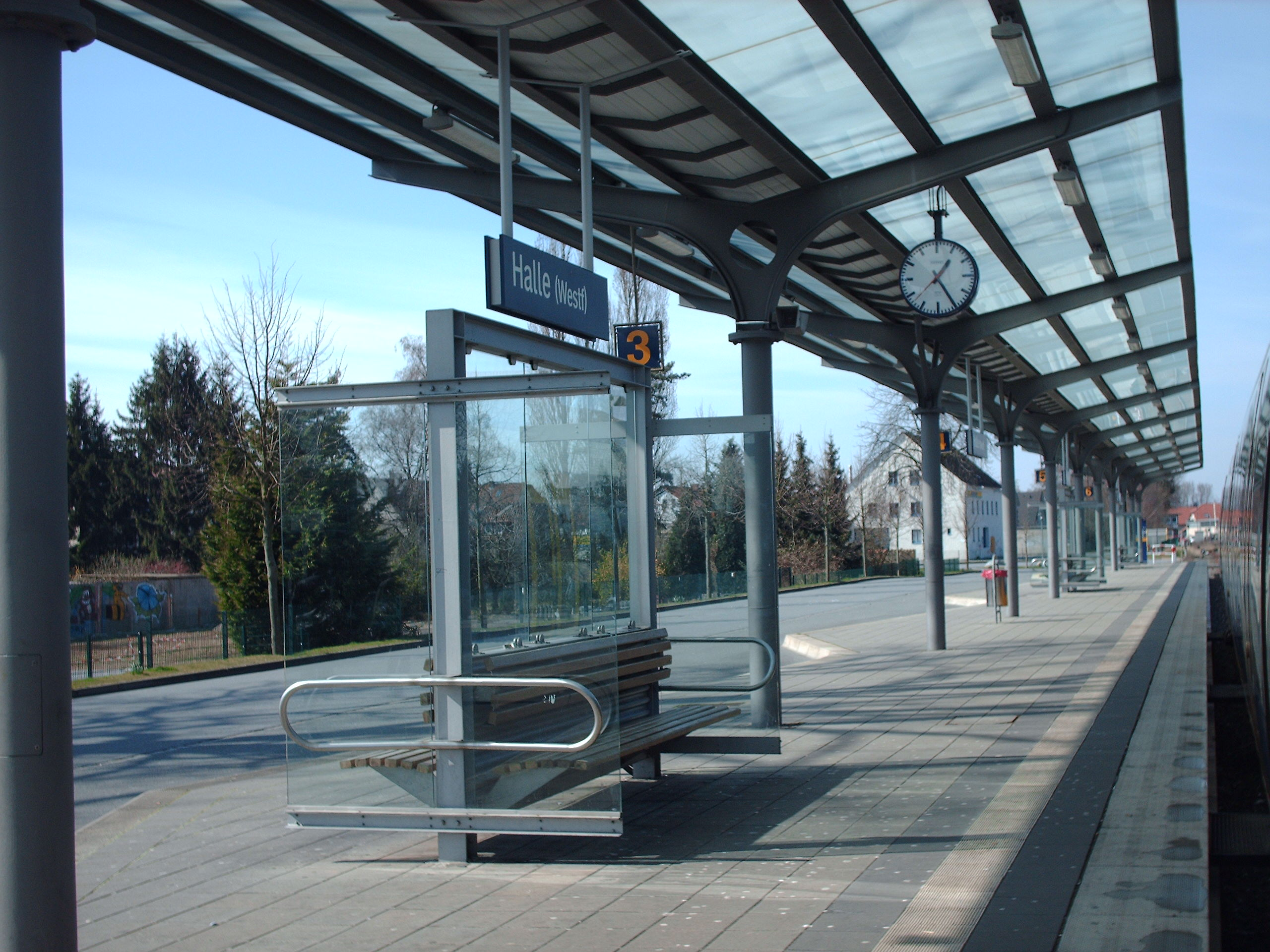

General information
- Location: Halle (Westfalen), NRW; Germany
- Coordinates: 52°03′26″N 8°21′30″E
- Owner: DB Netz
- Operator: DB Station&Service
- Line: Osnabrück–Brackwede railway (KBS 402)
- Platforms: 2 side platforms
- Tracks: 2
- Train operators: NordWestBahn

Construction
- Accessible: Yes

Other information
- Station code: 2500
- DS100 code: EHAL
- Category: 6
- Fare zone: Westfalentarif: 60711; VOS: Der Sechser (Westfalentarif transitional tariff)
- Website: www.bahnhof.de

History
- Opened: 15 August 1886

Services
Preceding station	NordWestBahn	Following station
Halle Gerry-Weber-Stadion towards Osnabrück Hbf	RB 75	Künsebeck towards Bielefeld Hbf
Location
- Location within North Rhine-Westphalia

Halle (Westf) is a railway station located in Halle, North Rhine-Westphalia, Germany. The station is on the Osnabrück–Brackwede railway. The train services are operated by NordWestBahn.

== Train services ==
The following services currently call at Halle:

Series	Train Type	Route	Material	Frequency	Notes
RB 75	NordWestBahn	Osnabrück Hbf - Osnabrück-Sutthausen - Oesede - Kloster Oesede - Wellendorf - Hilter - Dissen-Bad Rothenfelde - Westbarthausen - Borgholzhausen - Hesseln - Halle Gerry-Weber-Stadion - Halle (Westf) - Künsebeck - Steinhagen - Steinhagen Bielefelder Straße - Quelle - Quelle-Kupferheide - Brackwede – Bielefeld Hbf	Bombardier Talent	Every 30 Minutes (1x per hour on sundays and hollidays)	Haller Willem
