= Quelle-Kupferheide station =

Railway station in Germany

Quelle Kupferheide
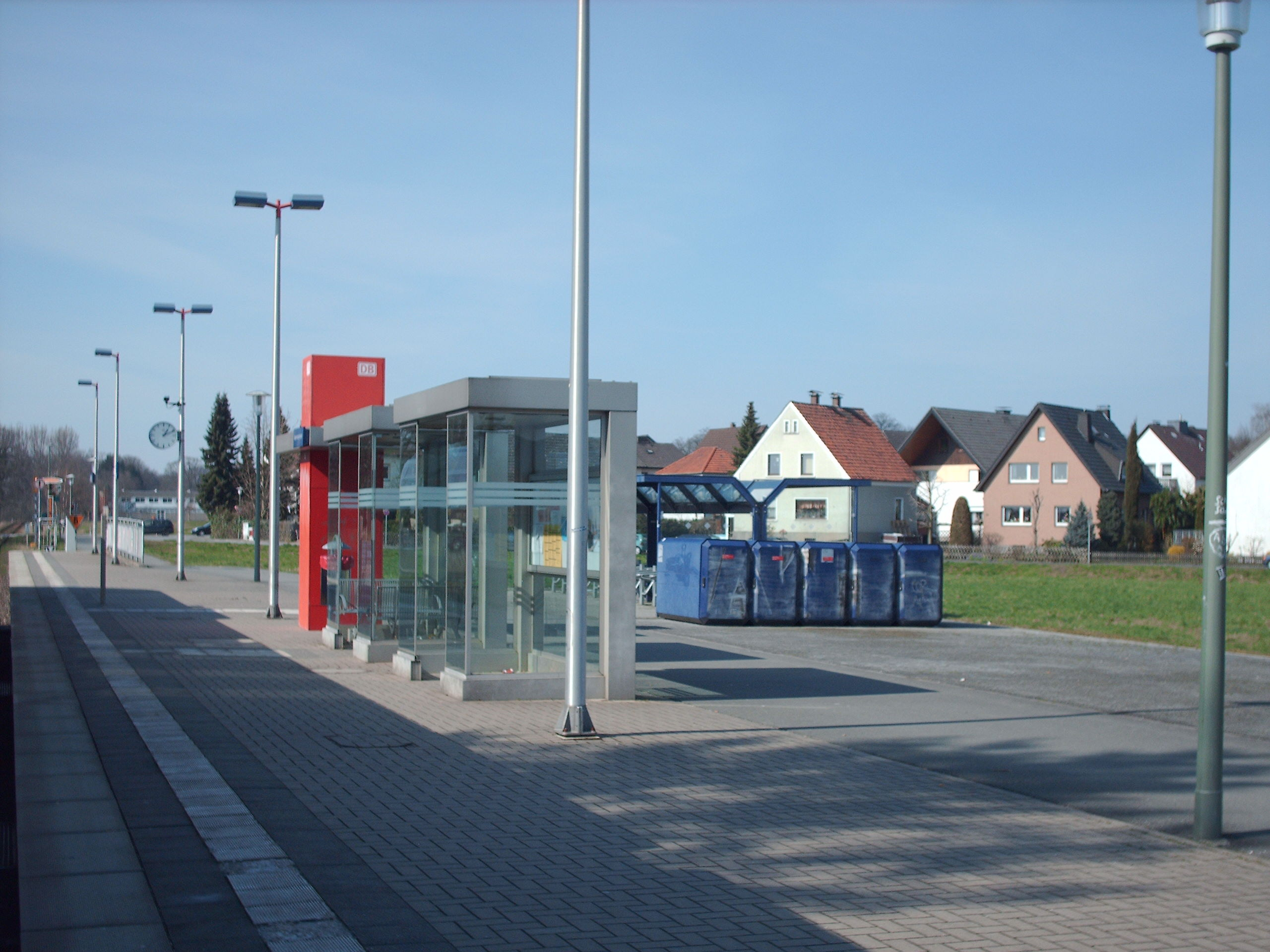

General information
- Location: Bielefeld, NRW; Germany
- Coordinates: 51°59′39″N 8°28′36″E
- Line: Osnabrück–Brackwede railway (KBS 402)
- Platforms: 1

Construction
- Accessible: Yes

Other information
- Station code: 4914
- DS100 code: EQLK
- Category: 6
- Fare zone: Westfalentarif: 60131; VOS: Der Sechser (Westfalentarif transitional tariff)
- Website: www.bahnhof.de

History
- Opened: 2000

Services
Preceding station	NordWestBahn	Following station
Quelle towards Osnabrück Hbf	RB 75	Brackwede towards Bielefeld Hbf
Location

Quelle-Kupferheide is a railway station located in Bielefeld, Germany. The station is on the Osnabrück–Brackwede railway. The train services are operated by NordWestBahn.

== Train services ==
The following services currently call at Quelle-Kupferheide:

Series	Route	Frequency
RB 75	Osnabrück Hbf - Osnabrück-Sutthausen - Oesede - Kloster Oesede - Wellendorf - Hilter - Dissen-Bad Rothenfelde - Westbarthausen - Borgholzhausen - Hesseln - Halle Gerry-Weber-Stadion - Halle (Westf) - Künsebeck - Steinhagen - Steinhagen Bielefeldstrasse - Quelle - Quelle-Kupferheide - Brackwede – Bielefeld Hbf	1x per hour
