= Quelle =

Quelle may refer to:

== People ==
- Horst Matthai Quelle (1912–1999), German philosopher
- Quelle Chris (born 1984), American rapper

== Other ==
- Quelle (Bible), a hypothesized collection of Jesus' sayings
- Quelle station, in Bielefeld, Germany
- Quelle-Kupferheide station, located in Bielefeld, Germany
- Quelle, a German department store now part of Karstadt
- Quelle AG, now part of Arcandor
