= Osnabrück–Brackwede railway =

Railway line in Germany

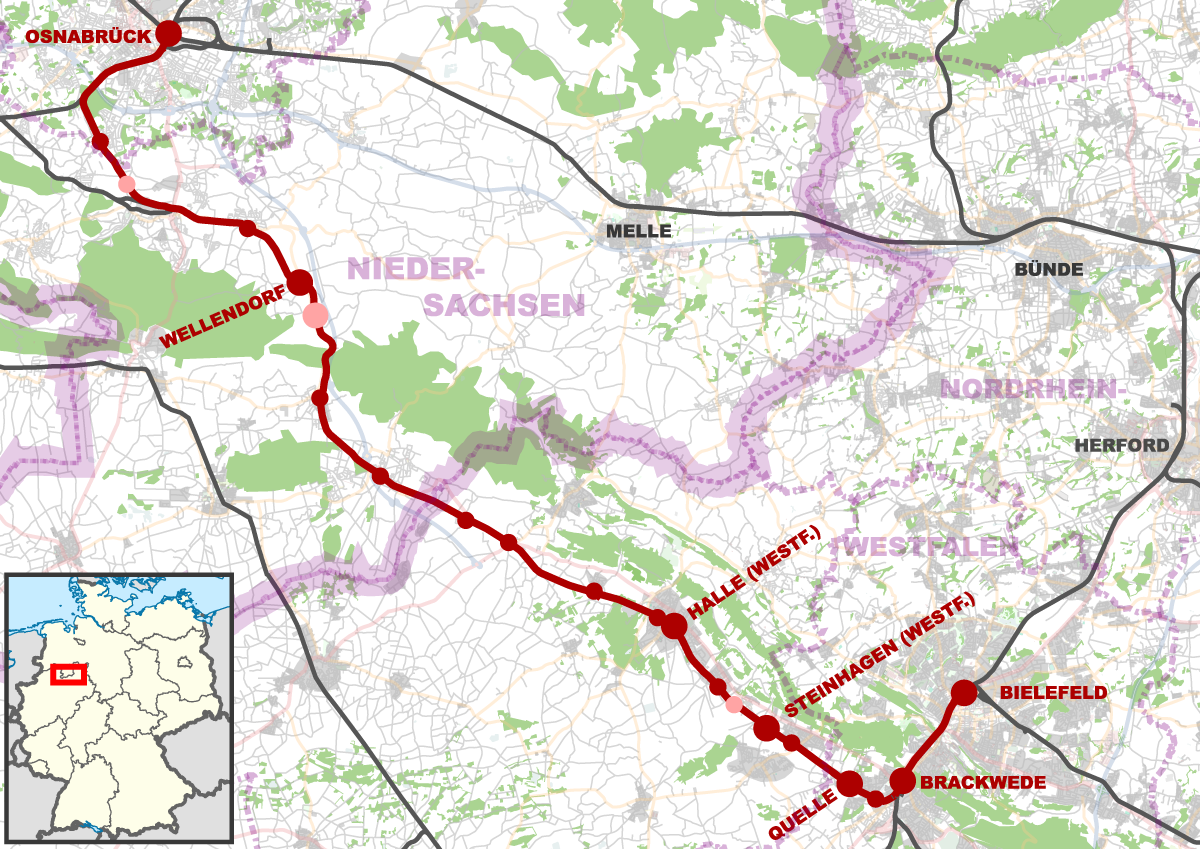

Overview
- Native name: Bahnstrecke Osnabrück–Brackwede or Haller Willem
- Line number: 2950
- Locale: North Rhine-Westphalia and Lower Saxony, Germany

Service
- Route number: 402

Technical
- Line length: 53 km (33 mi)
- Number of tracks: 2
- Track gauge: 1,435 mm (4 ft 8 1/2 in) standard gauge
- Operating speed: 80 km/h (49.7 mph) (maximum)

The Osnabrück–Brackwede railway, also the called the Haller Willem, is a single-track branch line running through the Teutoburg Forest (German: Teutoburger Wald) from Osnabrück via Dissen-Bad Rothenfelde and Halle (Westf) to Brackwede in the German state of North Rhine-Westphalia. The line is known for its steep climb to the Teutoburg Forest, where a tunnel was omitted for cost reasons. The railway was built in 1886 in response to demands for a line from Osnabrück to Bielefeld. In 1984, the section from Osnabrück to Dissen-Bad Rothenfelde was closed for passenger traffic, freight traffic continued until 1991. After numerous protests this section of track was reactivated in 2005. The entire line is owned by Deutsche Bahn, but the section from Dissen-Bad Rothenfelde to Osnabrück has been leased to the Verkehrsgesellschaft Landkreis Osnabrück (transport company of Osnabrück district). The Brackwede–Dissen section is part of Deutsche Bahn’s Münster-Ostwestfalen regional network (MOW).

== Route ==
The Haller Willem line branches from the Wanne-Eickel–Hamburg railway at Hörne. The junction is located at 74 metres above sea level. The line then runs through Sutthausen and Malbergen stations. At Oesede station in Georgsmarienhütte the line is already 94 metres above sea level. After Oesede the line passes through the stations of Kloster Oesede and Wellendorf. The former Hankenberge station lies 177 metres above sea level and is situated close to the highest point of the line. The line runs on a grade of 1:50 through the Teutoburg Forest and passes through Hilter station to Dissen-Bad Rothenfelde station, which is 97 metres above sea level. The line runs largely on the level from Dissen-Bad Rothenfelde through the stations of Westbarthausen, Borgholzhausen, Hesseln and Halle Gerry Weber Stadion to Halle in Westfalen station. The line continues through the plain to Brackwede through the stations of Künsebeck, Steinhagen in Westphalia, Steinhagen Bielefelder Straße, Quelle and Quelle-Kupferheide. In Brackwede the line connects to the main line to Minden.

== Meaning of the name ==
The name Haller Willem ("William from Halle") refers to the carter Wilhelm Stuckemeyer. He was among the men who transported goods between Bielefeld and Osnabrück before the construction of the line. The Halle–Brackwede road that Stuckemeyer operated on quickly acquired the name of Haller Willem due to his popularity among the locals. This name was then used for the railway line built shortly later and has survived to this day.

== History ==
The first evidence for the extraction of coal in Borgloh (now part of Hilter) comes from 1460. With the beginning of industrialisation at the beginning of the 19th century coal mining steadily increased. The coal was taken by horse and cart from Borgloh to Osnabrück. The horse-drawn wagons could not cope with the increasing coal traffic. The construction of a railway like those being built in England was considered as a solution.

Other municipalities near Borgloh also supported the construction of a railway. On 25 July 1878, the engineer Mackensen and the government architect Richard planned a railway line from Osnabrück to Brackwede, which would connect the villages of Borgloh, Rothenfelde and Oesede to the German railway network.

The plans envisaged that the line would be built as a 750 mm gauge railway. This would have reduced the cost of the structures on the line. The disadvantage was that the freight would have had to be transhipped at the terminal stations, which is why the line was ultimately built to standard gauge. One problem that became clear during the planning was the differences in altitude in the Teutoburg forest. Because it was decided to avoid a tunnel for cost reasons, tight bends were required on a grade of 1:40 on this section. It was estimated that the construction of the railway line would cost 2.5 million marks. In a cost comparison it was calculated that the line would yield a surplus of 127,000 marks a year.

The Prussian government rejected the project on 8 June 1879, as it was first focussing on the construction of main lines. The explanatory report continued to serve as a template for its possible construction. On 10 May 1880, a railway committee was founded in Bad Oeynhausen to campaign for the construction of a railway from Osnabrück to Brackwede. It basically adopted the route of the explanatory report, but the line would be able to be extended to Detmold and Bergheim. Eleven people were constantly involved with the railway committee, including Mayor Brüning of Osnabrück and Mayor Huber of Bielefeld. On the very day of the founding of the committee, it wrote a letter to the Royal Ministry of Public Works (Königliche Staatsministerium für öffentliche Arbeiten). In this letter, it again described the necessity of building the railway. The responsible railway administration now endorsed the project but demanded a grant of 10,000 marks per kilometre for the construction of the line. It was subsequently agreed that the payment would be 3,000 marks per km, with the municipalities and companies agreeing to participate in the payment.

Parliament approved the construction of the railway in March 1882 and 2.6 million marks were made available for it on 15 May 1882. In the following months the committee struggled to overcome problems as some municipalities and companies did not want to pay their share of the subsidies.

=== Planning and construction ===
The planning of the route was completed at the end of 1882. All plans for the railway stations, bridges and culverts were completed in the summer of 1883. In the following months, the line was divided into seven sections for construction. On 17 December 1883, the proposed route was verified by the National Police.

On 5 January 1885, the proposed project was advertised in the Osnabrücker Zeitung newspaper and a period of 14 days was specified for objections. On 2 May 1885, the first ground-breaking ceremony was held in Dissen-Bad Rothenfelde and a celebration was held at the Hotel Zur Post. For the first eleven months, the line was built largely by hand. The works were only hindered by two obstacles. Baron Korff demanded that there be a halt on his property near Sutthausen. It was agreed that the train would stop there if a flag was raised. The plot of a widow at Horne had to be expropriated and the purchase price was set at 3,726.60 marks. Eleven months after the groundbreaking, a work train was welcomed with festivities in Dissen-Bad Rothenfelde. On 15 July 1886, the two building crews met in Hankenberge, completing the line. Trial runs were held on the line from mid-July to early August.

=== Station buildings ===
The station buildings of the Haller Willem are interesting. To save costs, the building of Dissen-Bad Rothenfelde and Halle were "recycled". The building of Dissen is the former station building of Hildesheim, which was replaced after the nationalisation of the Hanover-Altenbeken Railway Company with a new, somewhat more northerly Hauptbahnhof (main station). Since the first railway reached Hildesheim in 1846, the building is one of the oldest surviving station buildings in Germany and is a listed building. The first building at Halle, which was demolished in 1963 and replaced by the current station building, was originally the station building of Hannover-Süd station of the Hanover-Altenbeken Railway Company, which after its nationalisation and the connection of the Hanover–Altenbeken railway to Hanover Hauptbahnhof was no longer needed. The remaining buildings were built according to Prussian standard designs. The brick building could be varied with mirrored floor plans or by omitting a floor. So there were similarities. The stations of Künsebeck and Westbarthausen were similar and the building of Steinhagen, Borgholzhausen, Wellendorf and Oesede also matched.

=== Opening and operations ===
Ticket prices at the opening
From Osnabrück	2nd class	3rd class
To Oesede	1.10 marks	0.80 marks
To Ottoschacht	1.40 marks	0.90 marks
To Wellendorf	1.70 marks	1.10 marks
To Dissen-Rothenfelde	2.60 marks	1.70 marks
To Borgholzhausen	3.20 marks	2.10 marks
To Halle	3.80 marks	2.60 marks
To Steinhagen	4.40 marks	2.90 marks
To Brackwede	5.00 marks	3.30 marks

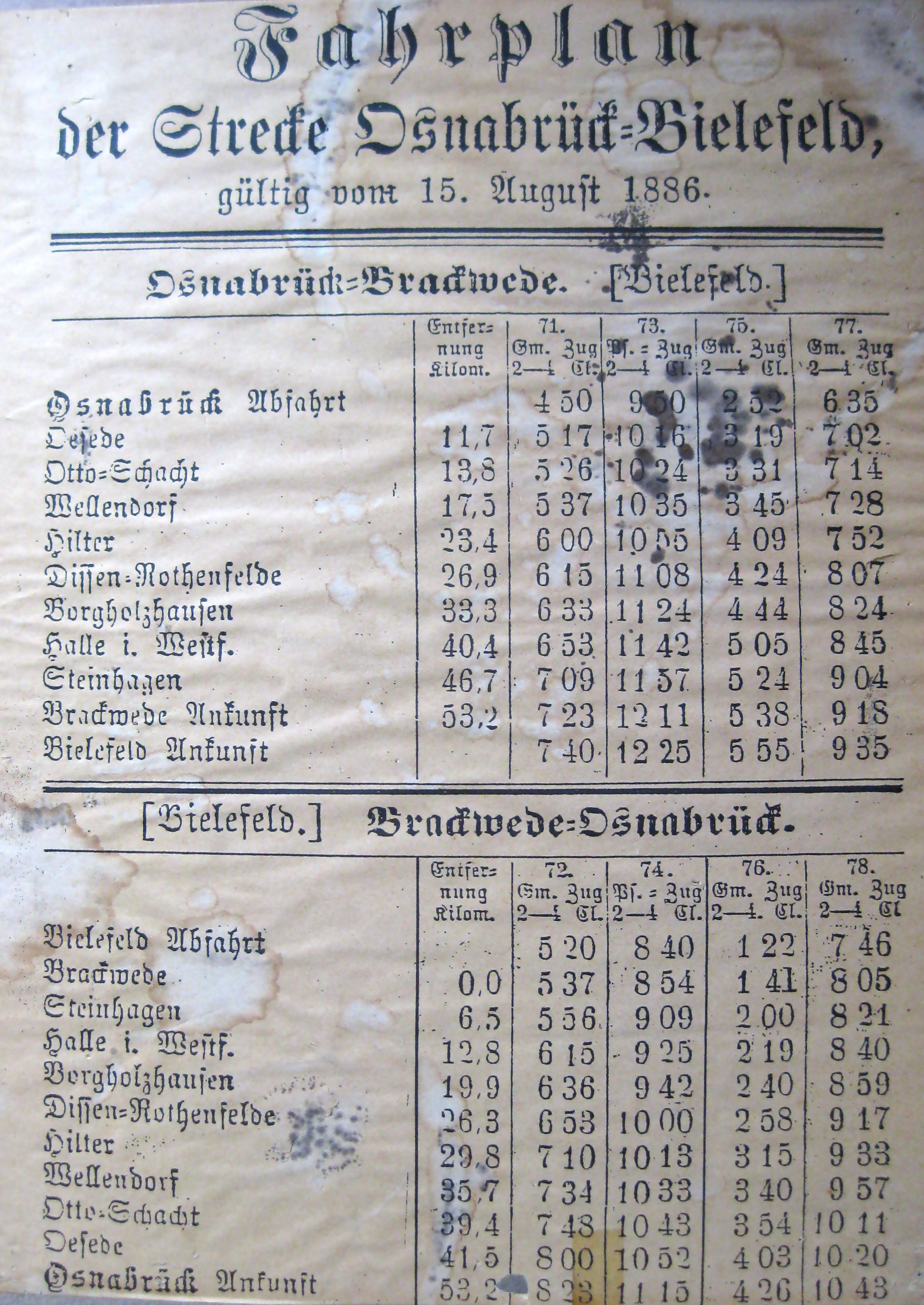
Facsimile of the first timetable, valid from 15 August 1886

On 6 August 1886, the city of Osnabrück issued a letter of invitation to the opening of the line and it was formerly opened on 14 August 1886. A special train left that day at approximately noon from the Cologne-Minden station in Osnabrück. The train arrived at about 2 PM in Dissen-Bad Rothenfelde and a lunch for invited guests was provided in Rothenfelde. The special train consisted of five magnificent decorated passenger cars, hauled by a steam locomotive. The fares from Osnabrück were set on 14 August 1886. The Osnabrücker Zeitung reported that the line would be well received by tourists because of the landscape and that many excursions were already planned by clubs. The line was operated from the opening by four pairs of trains a day, but these were so-called mixed trains, as they also included freight wagons and had a running time of two and a half hours. The citizens were outraged over this long traveling time since a journey via Löhne was shorter by a few minutes despite the detour.

The Haller Willem quickly became a mainstay of the economy in the region. Natural resources were transported out of the Teutoburg Forest, but it also brought workers and school students to the towns. It also connected with some tourist destinations. On 6 February 1905, the railway division (Eisenbahndirektion) of Munster, announced that they wanted to raise the speed limit on the line to 50 km/h. The infrastructure, especially the level crossings, were improved for this purpose. Already six services ran on the Haller Willem in the timetable of 1905. Travel time was cut to only around two hours as a result of the structural improvements. Services were increased up to the First World War to five pairs of trains and seven more running on part of the line. After the First World War there were six pairs of trains and a pair of trains that went only as far as Wellendorf. The travel time of the fastest trains was reduced to only one hour and 45 minutes. In addition, six freight trains operated, although it is not known what they carried.

In 1920, the first level-crossing barrier system on the line was put in operation at Dissen-Rothenfelde station. The barrier was later considered to be a nuisance as the track was often closed for long periods.

From the 1960s the railway had ever stronger competition from the road. Many goods could now be more cheaply and conveniently be transported by truck and many travellers used cars and buses. The utilization of the services of the Haller Willems declined.

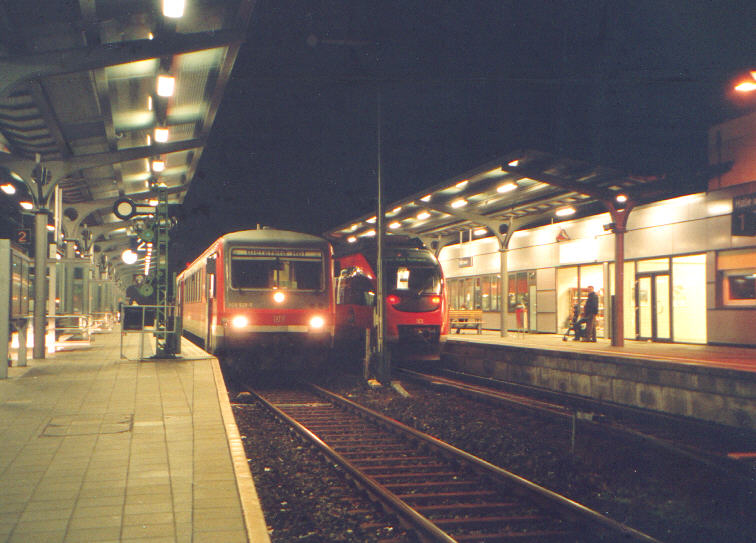
Trains crossing in Halle (Westf.) in 2003: classes 628 and 644 (Bombardier Talent)

On 2 June 1984, the passenger services were finally abandoned between Osnabrück and Dissen-Rothenfelde. Freight traffic continued on this section until 31 May 1991, but at the beginning of the 1990s Deutsche Bahn (DB) wanted to abandon freight traffic and to dismantle the track northwest of Dissen-Rothenfelde. This was prevented by a citizens' initiative called the Initiative Haller Willem.

DB developed a program to modernise passenger and freight operations on the southeastern section between Dissen-Bad Rothenfelde and Bielefeld. This was eventually implemented by the Ostwestfalen-Lippe region as a decentralised project in support of Expo 2000 in Hanover. The Zweckverband VerkehrsVerbund OstWestfalenLippe (Ostwestfalen-Lippe transport association) took over management of the project. As a result, the line was renovated in 1999/2000 and equipped with the latest technology. The municipalities participated intensively to modernise the station environments and the designation of new residential developments near the line.

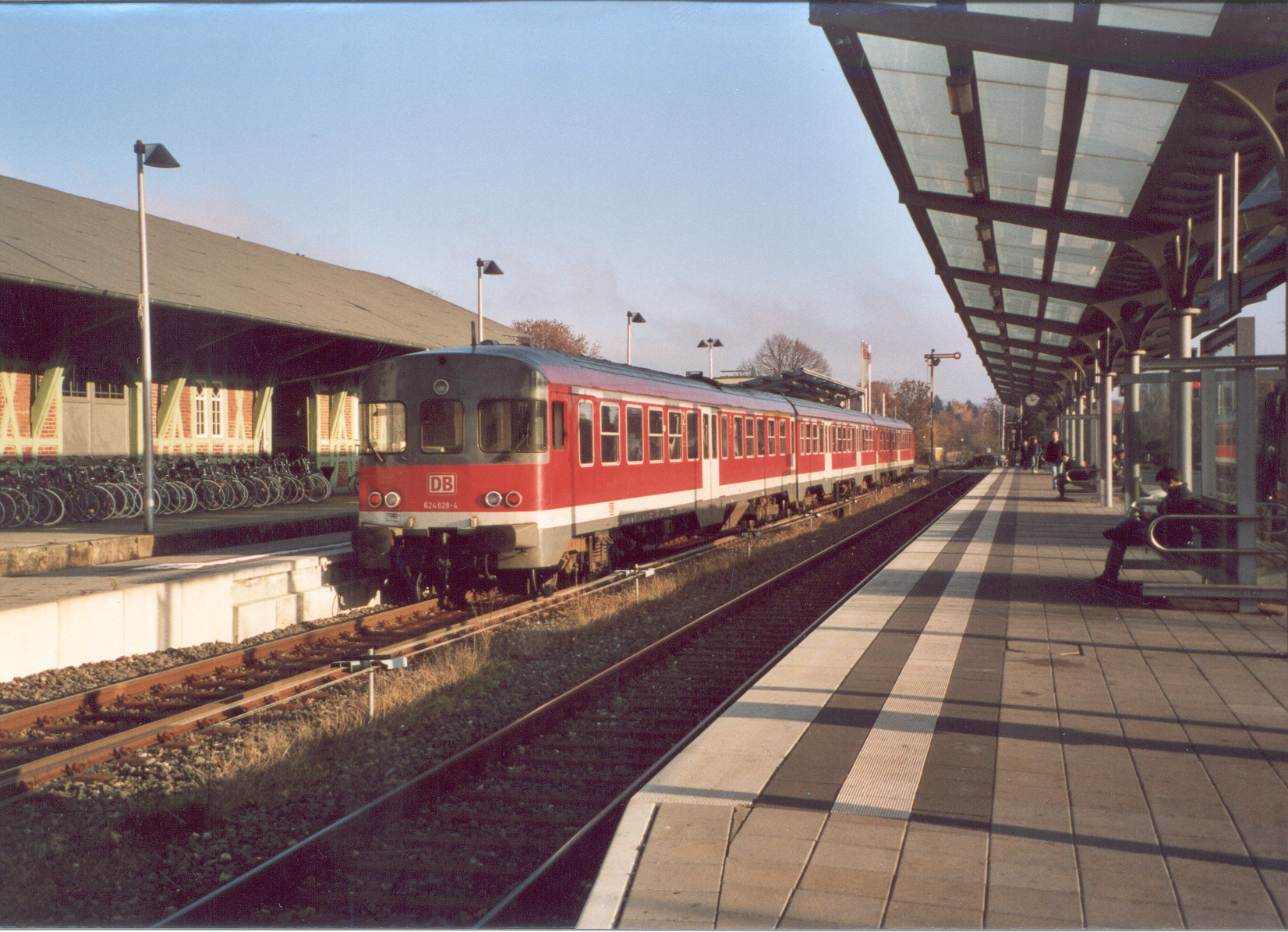
624 648-4 is time-tabled in November 2003 as a temporary replacement of a class 644/628 railcar on the Haller Willem

In order to make the route more attractive for cycling tourism, a nearby cycle path from Osnabrück via Bielefeld to Paderborn was signed as the Teuto-Senne BahnRadRoute (rail-cycling route). Especially on weekends in the summer, a large proportion of passengers travel with bicycles. Cyclists have become an important factor for the preservation of the rail link.

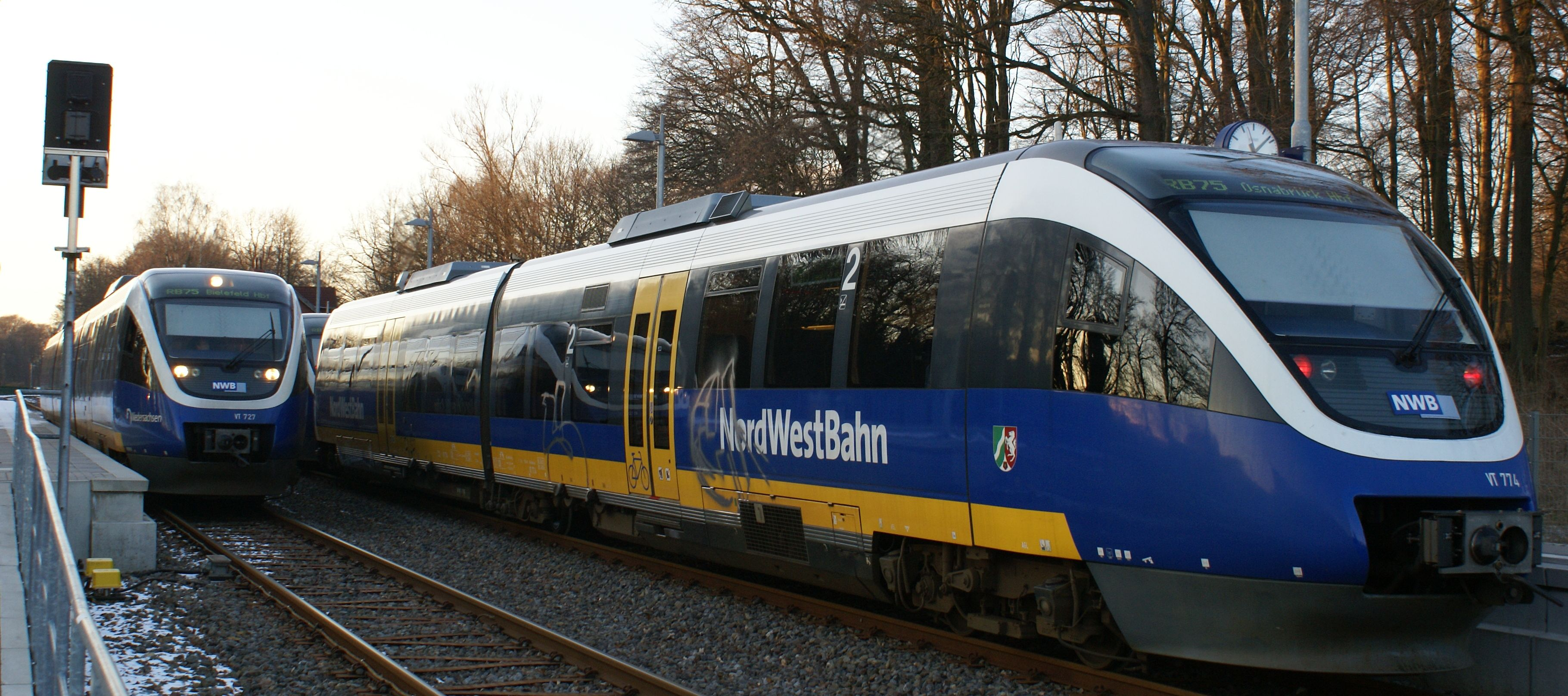
Two Bombardier Talent railcars of NordWestBahn in Wellendorf station in February 2009

After the NordWestBahn (NWB) won the contract for the Ems-Senne-Weser network in Ostwestfalen-Lippe and neighbouring Münsterland, it submitted an attractive offer to the transport association for the operation of services on the Haller Willem. As a result, the NWB has operated it since 15 December 2003.

Until 10 June 2005, trains only ran between Bielefeld and Dissen-Bad Rothenfelde. This section is part of DB’s Münster–Ostwestfalen (MOW ) regional network, which is based in Münster.

In 1999, Verkehrsgesellschaft Landkreis Osnabrück (transport company district of Osnabrück, VLO) leased the section in Lower Saxon from Deutsche Bahn for 30 years for the symbolic price of €1, with the intention of reactivating it. After a cost-benefit study by the Landesnahverkehrsgesellschaft Niedersachsen (state public transport company of Lower Saxony) predicted that a reactivated service would carry 3,600 passengers a day, the VLO completely renovated and modernised the section.

DB Netz AG took into operation an electronic interlocking on the section On 3 May 2012. The stations of Quelle, Steinhagen and Halle have since been centrally controlled. The line has been controlled from a regional control centre in Lage (which has the acronym of Lzf) since 25 January 2013.

== Rollingstock ==
Because of the gradient locomotives with small wheels were used in the steam era. Freight locomotives were preferred because of the operation of mixed trains together with passenger trains. Pure passenger locomotives such as the Prussian P 8 still ran in the 1960s on replacement services, while DR class 24 locomotives, which were also used, were unpopular with the staff because of their centrifugal tendency. From the 1940s, DRB class 50 locomotives were used on the line and continued in use until the late 1960s. Prussian T 14.1 locomotives were used on the Haller Willem from 1930 until the winter 1962 timetable change as stock locomotives. Prussian T 16 and Prussian T 16.1 locomotives were also used as stock locomotives from the late 1920s until the early 1960s. With the electrification in other parts of the Federal Republic, DRB class 50 locomotives were used for regional services over the whole line from 1963. DRB class 41 locomotives were used on the "flat section" between Bielefeld and Dissen-Bad Rothenfelde. In the 1960s, freight trains were so well utilised that the evening freight train 8888 from Bielefeld to Osnabrück marshalling yard was hauled regularly from Dissen by two coupled class 50 locomotives.

DB Class V 100 diesel locomotives were used from 1963 to 1983 to haul freight and passenger trains, even for shunting operations in stations. DB class 216 locomotives were used for individual services regularly from the mid-1970s, shortly after their deployment in Oldenburg and Osnabrück. Freight trains were operated from 1972 until the early 1990s using DB class V 90 locomotives. For a few years from 1975 until the cessation of passenger service on the northern section of the line, DB class V 200.0 locomotives were used on the Haller Willem.

Battery electric multiple units were used on the line from 1914; their use ended in 1944. Photographs show the use of DR class VT 75 that had replaced the battery railcars after the Second World War. Their use probably ended in 1954, with the introduction of railbuses. DB class VT 95 railbuses operated on the Haller Willem until 1966, but due to their poor performance on the gradient and the insufficient number of seats, they were replaced by DB Class VT 98 sets, while from 1963 both classes were used. From 1962 until 1980, DB class ETA 150 battery railcars operated on the line. From 1964, DB class VT 24 railcars also operated on the line, with individual railcars being used as a substitute for other classes of railcars until 2003 on the Haller Willem. After 1975, DB Class 614 sets were used here, but their use ended around 2000. After 1993, almost all trains were run with class 628 sets, which were used until 2003. From 2000, Bombardier Talent sets were mainly used and from 2003 only Talent sets were used for passenger services.

== Current situation ==
The reactivation of the section to Osnabrück on 12 June 2005 was celebrated with numerous festivals along the line. Since then, the Haller Willem service has again operated from Bielefeld to Osnabrück. Simultaneously with the start-up a new composite fare for southern Osnabrück district (VOS-Plus) and a transition fare of the Zweckverband Verkehrsverbund OWL (Ostwestfalen-Lippe transport association)—Der Sechser (“the six”)—came into force. Not included in the transition fares are the neighbouring municipalities of Werther, Versmold, Bad Iburg and Bad Laer. The number of passengers has greatly increased since the reactivation of the line. The Haller Willem runs every half-hour at peak times between Bielefeld and Halle and the introduction of a continuous half-hourly service is discussed.

Freight transport operates to a siding located at Quelle station, which is served from Brackwede twice a week on Tuesdays and Thursdays. Empty wagons are delivered to the siding of the Kastrup Recycling company and are filled with scrap.

== Rail services ==
The line is served by Regionalbahn service RB 75 (Haller Willem), operated by NordWestBahn with Bombardier Talent diesel railcars. The speed limit on this section is 80 km/h and the average speed of the RB 75 is 46 km/h.
