= Halle railway station =

Halle railway station may refer to:

- Halle Hauptbahnhof in Germany
- Halle (Westf) station in Germany
- Halle railway station, Belgium
