= Georgsmarienhütte =

- Town
- Flag Coat of arms

- Location of Georgsmarienhütte within Osnabrück district
- Interactive map of Georgsmarienhütte
- Location within Germany Location within Lower Saxony
- Coordinates: 52°12′N 8°4′E
- Country: Germany
- State: Lower Saxony
- District: Osnabrück
- Subdivisions: 6 Ortsteile

Government
  - Mayor (2019–24): Dagmar Bahlo (SPD)

Area
  - Total: 55.45 km^{2} (21.41 sq mi)
- Elevation: 86–331 m (282–1,086 ft)

Population (2025-12-31)
  - Total: 31,074
  - Density: 560.4/km^{2} (1,451/sq mi)
- Time zone: UTC+01:00 (CET)
  - Summer (DST): UTC+02:00 (CEST)
- Postal codes: 49124
- Dialling codes: 05401
- Vehicle registration: OS, BSB, MEL, WTL
- Website: www.georgsmarienhuette.de

Georgsmarienhütte (German pronunciation: [ɡeːɔʁksmaˈʁiːənˌhʏtə]) is a town in the district of Osnabrück, in Lower Saxony, Germany. It is situated in the Teutoburg Forest, approx. 7 km south of Osnabrück.

== History ==
In 1856 the company "Georgs-Marien-Bergwerks- und Hüttenverein" was founded to erect an iron and steel works in the municipality of Malbergen. It was named after King George V of Hanover who supported industrial development, and his wife Marie. The workers’ housing estates grew and developed to the municipality Georgsmarienhütte. Malbergen became part of Georgsmarienhütte in 1937. In 1970, the municipalities Oesede, Kloster Oesede, Harderberg, Holsten-Mündrup, the southern part of Holzhausen and the "industrial village" Georgsmarienhütte were united to the city Georgsmarienhütte.

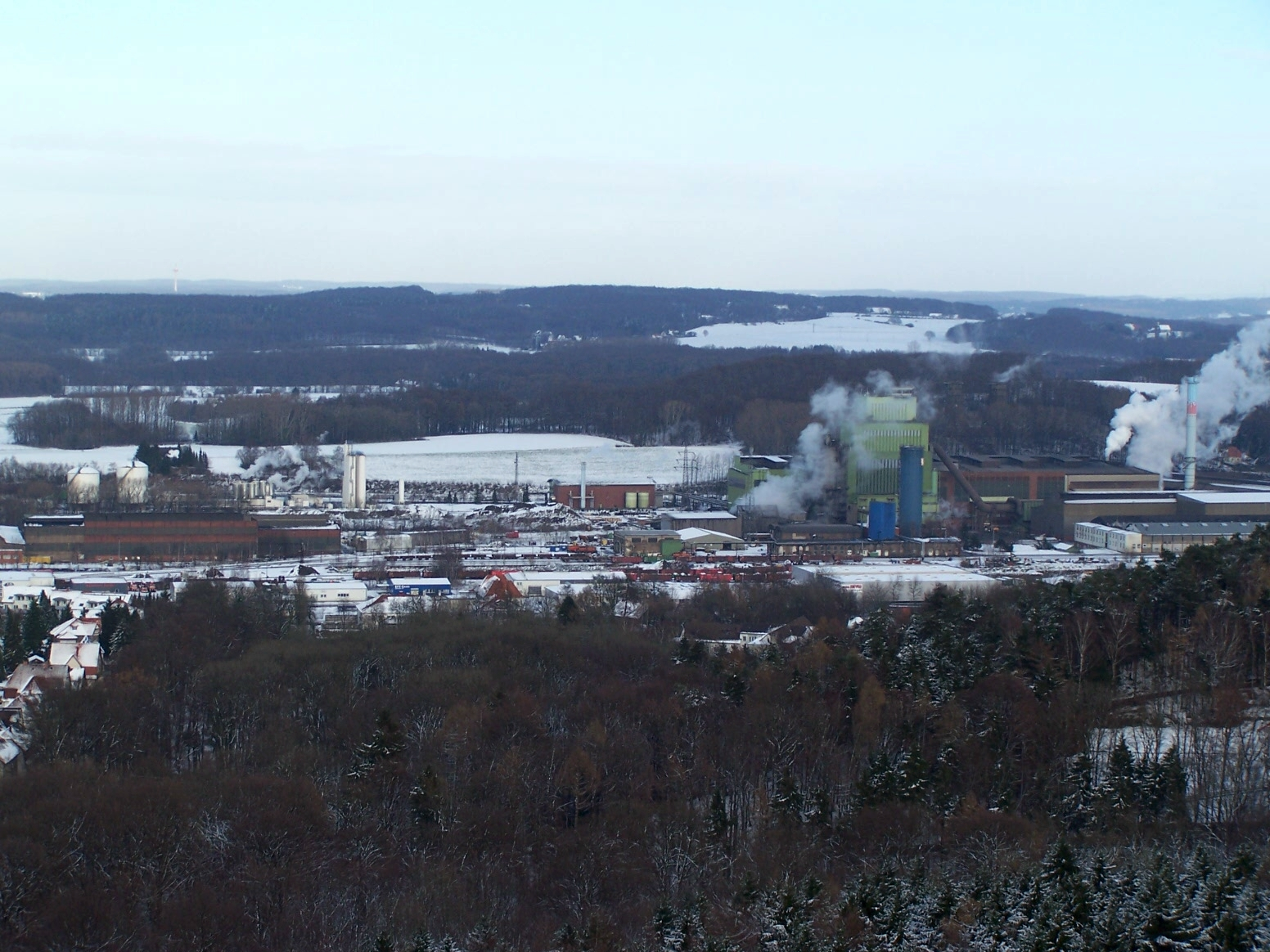
Steel works in 2006

The iron and steel works were one of the most important employers south of Osnabrück, employing several thousand people. Since 1923 it belonged to Klöckner Werke AG which suffered severely from the steel crises of the 1990s. In 1993, Klöckner manager Jürgen Großmann bought the steel works for a symbolic amount of money and transformed it to an efficient company which is one of the leading high-grade steel producers in Europe.

=== Kloster Oesede ===
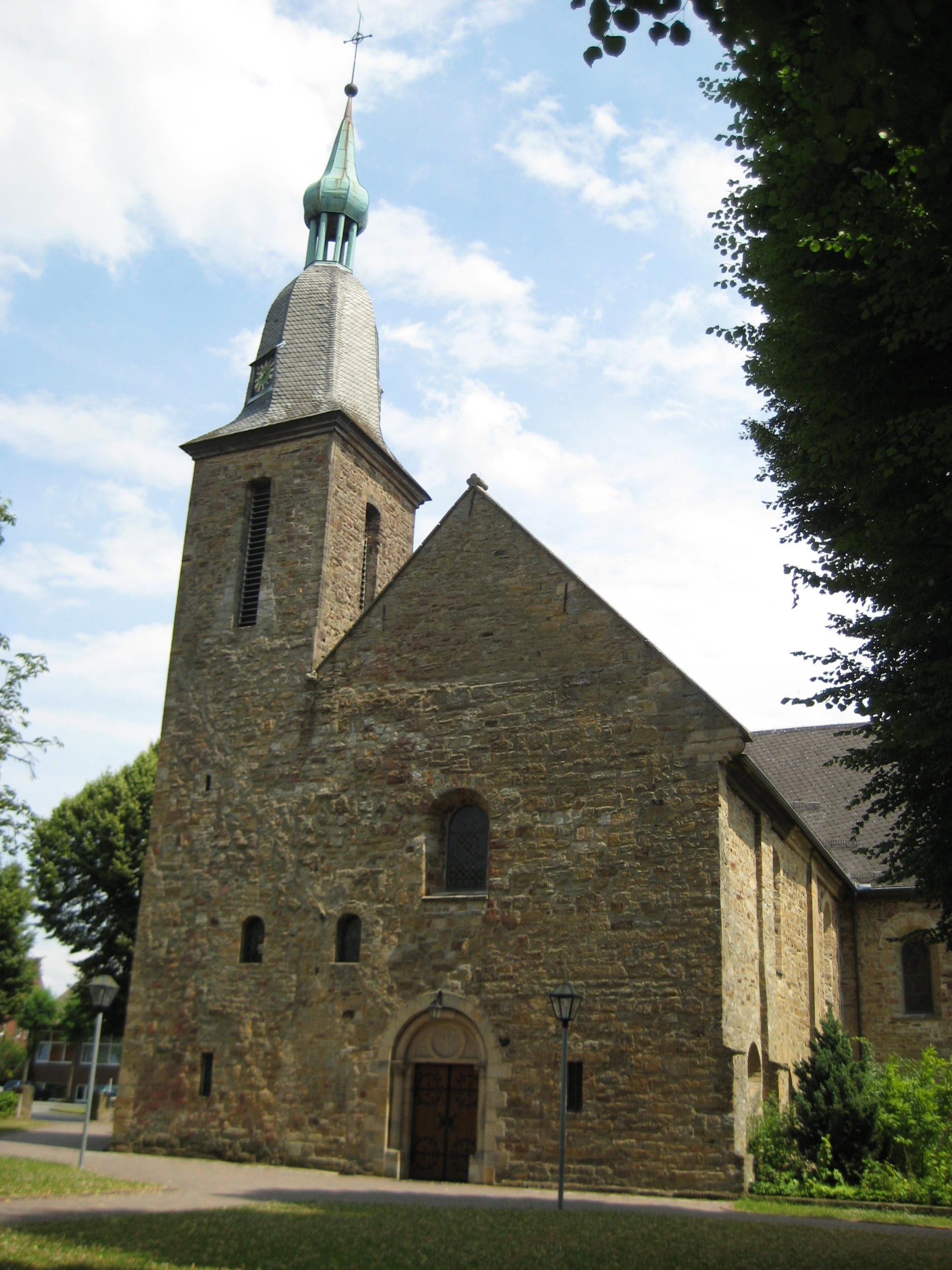
Church of the former convent Kloster Oesede

The most important historical building is the church of former convent Kloster Oesede dating from the 12th century. The Benedictine convent was founded by count Ludolf von Oesede (d. 1184) and his wife Thedela for which he donated his castle complex in the first half of the century. The convent gave its name as well to the former settlement Sutorpe. Kloster Oesede now is a part of the city Georgsmarienhütte. The convent was the first one in the district of Osnabrück. The convent’s first prior was Ludolf’s eldest daughter Goda. On January, 15th 1170 conventional life began. The convent became wealthy within the centuries by donations and the nuns' labour. It existed until 1803 when it was secularisated by the Reichsdeputationshauptschluss. The convent buildings from the Middle Ages were taken down between 1790 and 1803. Only the Alte Abtei (Old Abbey) remained. A new two-storey building was erected by Alexander Ludwig von Corvey (1670–1728) in 1723. It still exists and is used for partly parish and school purposes. The former convent’s church in which the donator count Ludolf and his wife were buried now is the Roman Catholic parish church St. Johann. A remarkable detail of the church is the Hagioscope which allowed lepers to join the service from outside. Another hagioscope was exposed nearby in St. Clemens, the monastery’s church in Bad Iburg.

== Transport ==
Georgsmarienhütte is served by the Osnabrück–Brackwede railway line which in turn leads to the rest of the country.

- Oesede station
- Kloster Oesede station

The city of Osnabrück is connected by road to the Autobahn A1, A30 and A33. In addition, there are regular and frequent bus lines with Osnabrück, as well as the surrounding countryside.

The nearest airport is the Münster Osnabrück Airport at a distance of 32 kilometers.

== Education ==
All of the types of German grammar schools are represented in the city. In addition to a folk high school, two boarding schools provide adult education in special courses which usually last a few days.

== Museums ==
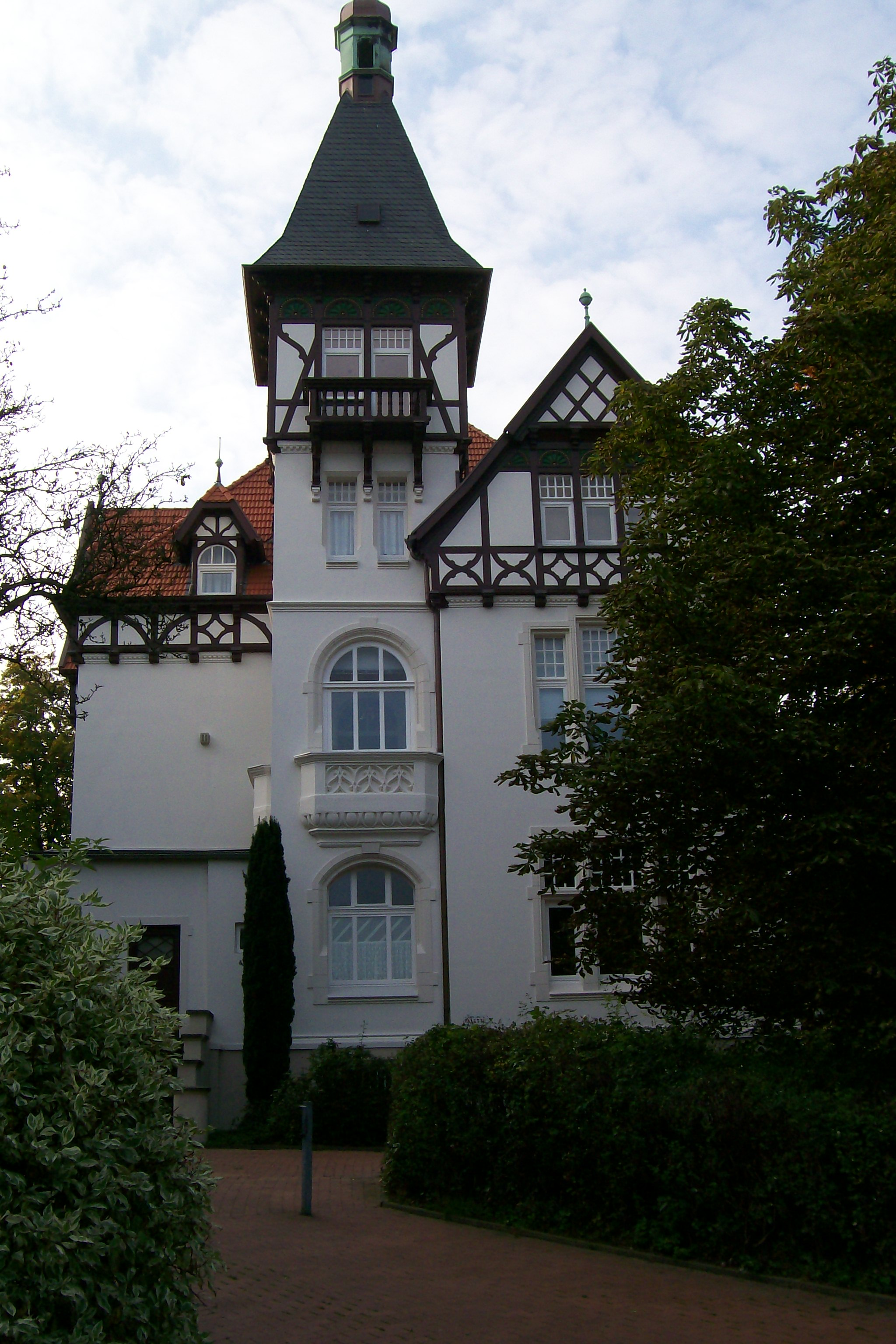
Museum Villa Stahmer

Museum Villa Stahmer is a museum of local history. The building was erected in 1900 by factory owner Robert Stahmer. He lived there with his family until 1907. It was in residential use until the end of World War II when it was used by British forces. Since 1947 it was used as an employment agency. In 1980, the museum was opened.

== Twin towns – sister cities ==
Georgsmarienhütte is twinned with:

- Emmen, Netherlands (1965)
- Ramat HaSharon, Israel (1976)
- Gmina Kłodzko, Poland (1998)

== Notable people ==
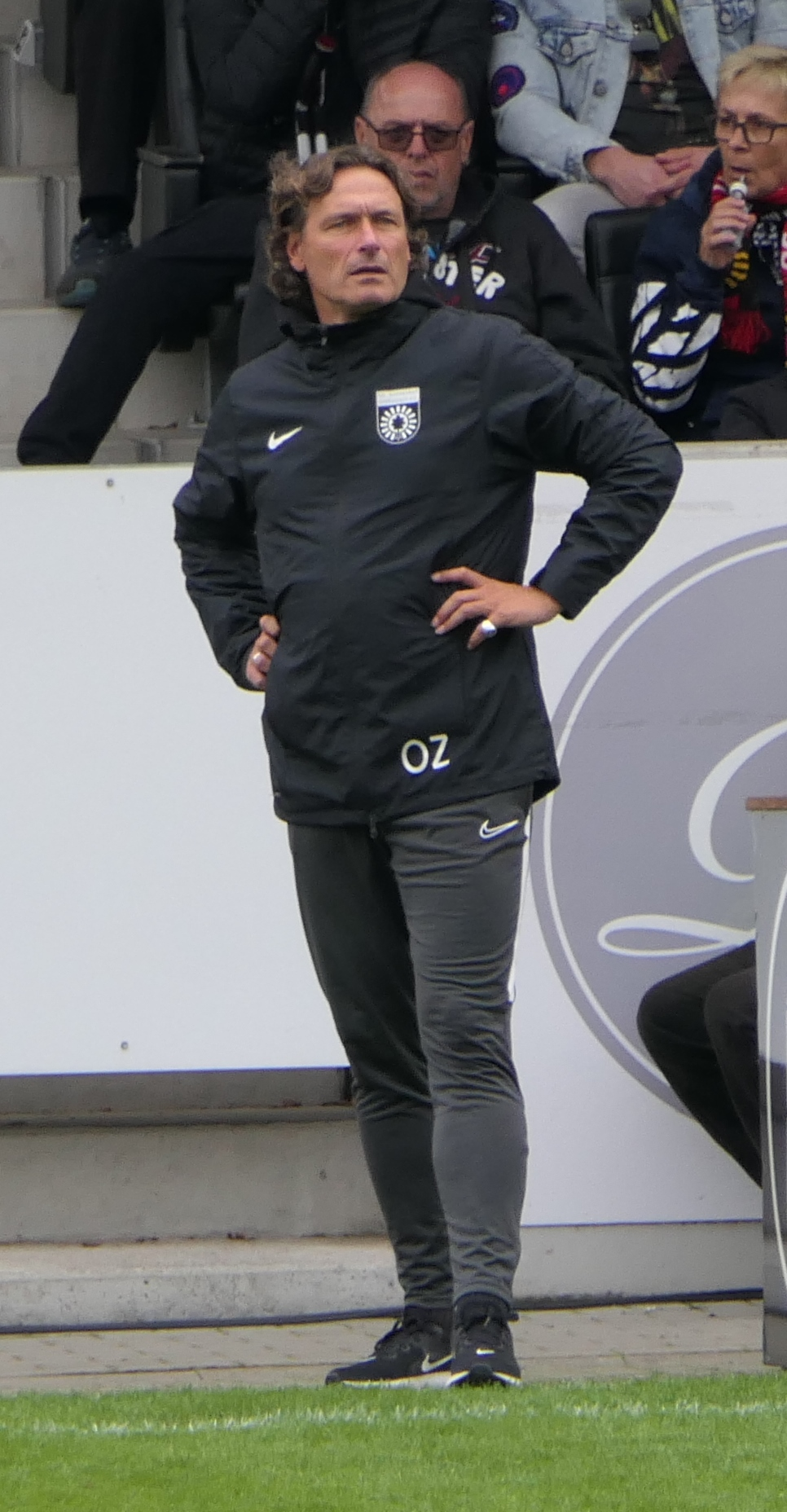
Oliver Zapel, 2019

- Joseph A. Hemann (1816–1897), German-American educator, newspaper publisher, and banker
- Walther Kranz (1884–1960), classical philologist and historian of philosophy
- Alfred Weidler (1886–1966), German-American architect
- Susanne Albers (born 1965), theoretical computer scientist
- Sascha Weidner (1974–2015), Photographer and artist
- Jonas Pohlmann (born 1996), politician

=== Sport ===
- Oliver Zapel (born 1968), former footballer and manager
- Nicole Brandebusemeyer (born 1974), football defender; played 8 games for Germany women
- Christine Adams (born 1974), pole vaulter
- Daniel Thioune (born 1974), footballer and football manager, played over 320 games
- Richard Spiegelburg (born 1977), pole vaulter
- Silke Spiegelburg (born 1986), pole vaulter
- Gerrit Nauber (born 1992), footballer who has played over 340 games

== Connected to Georgsmarienhütte ==
- Georg V of Hanover, (1819–1878) and his wife Marie of Saxe-Altenburg (1818–1907) gave their names to the firm Georgs-Marien-Bergwerks- and Hüttenverein, founded in 1856, and are thus the namesakes of the present city of Georgsmarienhütte.
- Jan Korte (born 1977), since 2005 a Member of the Bundestag, grew up in Oesede, Abitur at the Gymnasium Oesede in 1997.
