= Jonas Pohlmann =

German politician (born 1996)

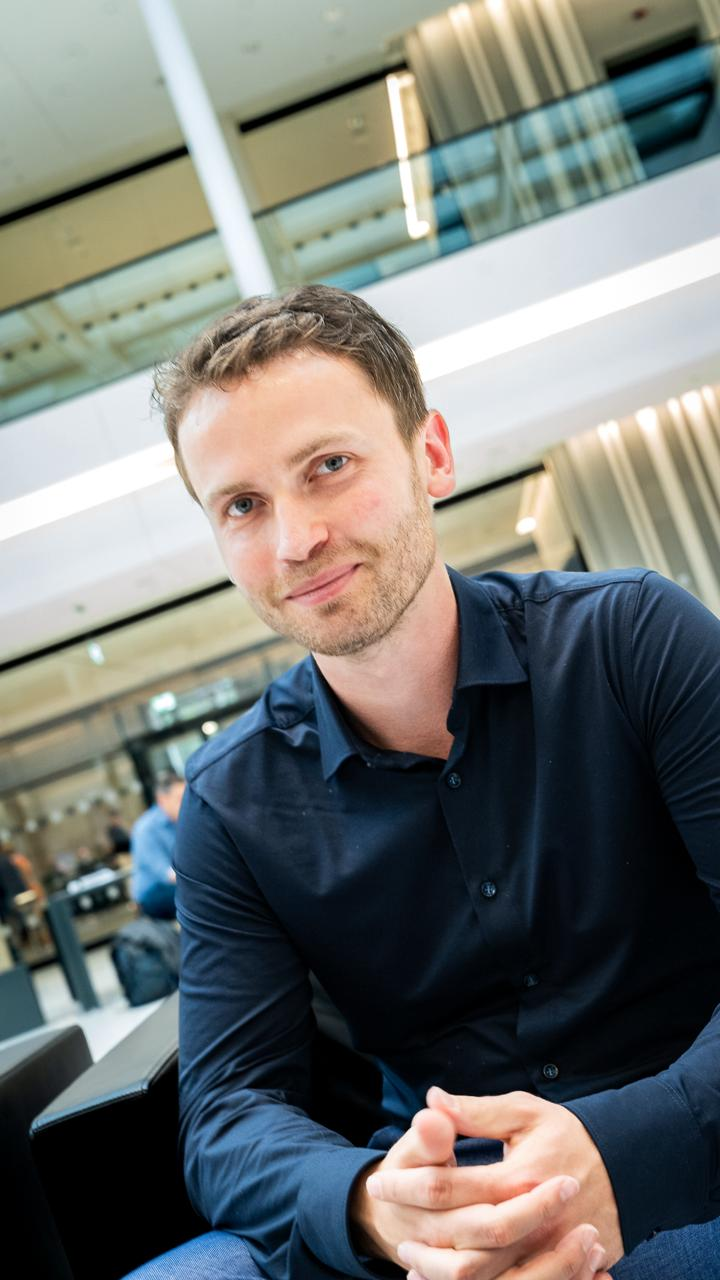
- Pohlmann in 2024

Member of the Landtag of Lower Saxony
- Incumbent
- Assumed office 8 November 2022

Personal details
- Born: 17 January 1996 (age 30) Georgsmarienhütte
- Party: Christian Democratic Union

Jonas Pohlmann (born 17 January 1996 in Georgsmarienhütte) is a German politician serving as a member of the Landtag of Lower Saxony since 2022. He has been a city councillor of Georgsmarienhütte since 2021.
