= Bratislava–Dunajská Streda–Komarno railway =

Railway line in Slovakia

Bratislava–Dunajská Streda–Komárno railway
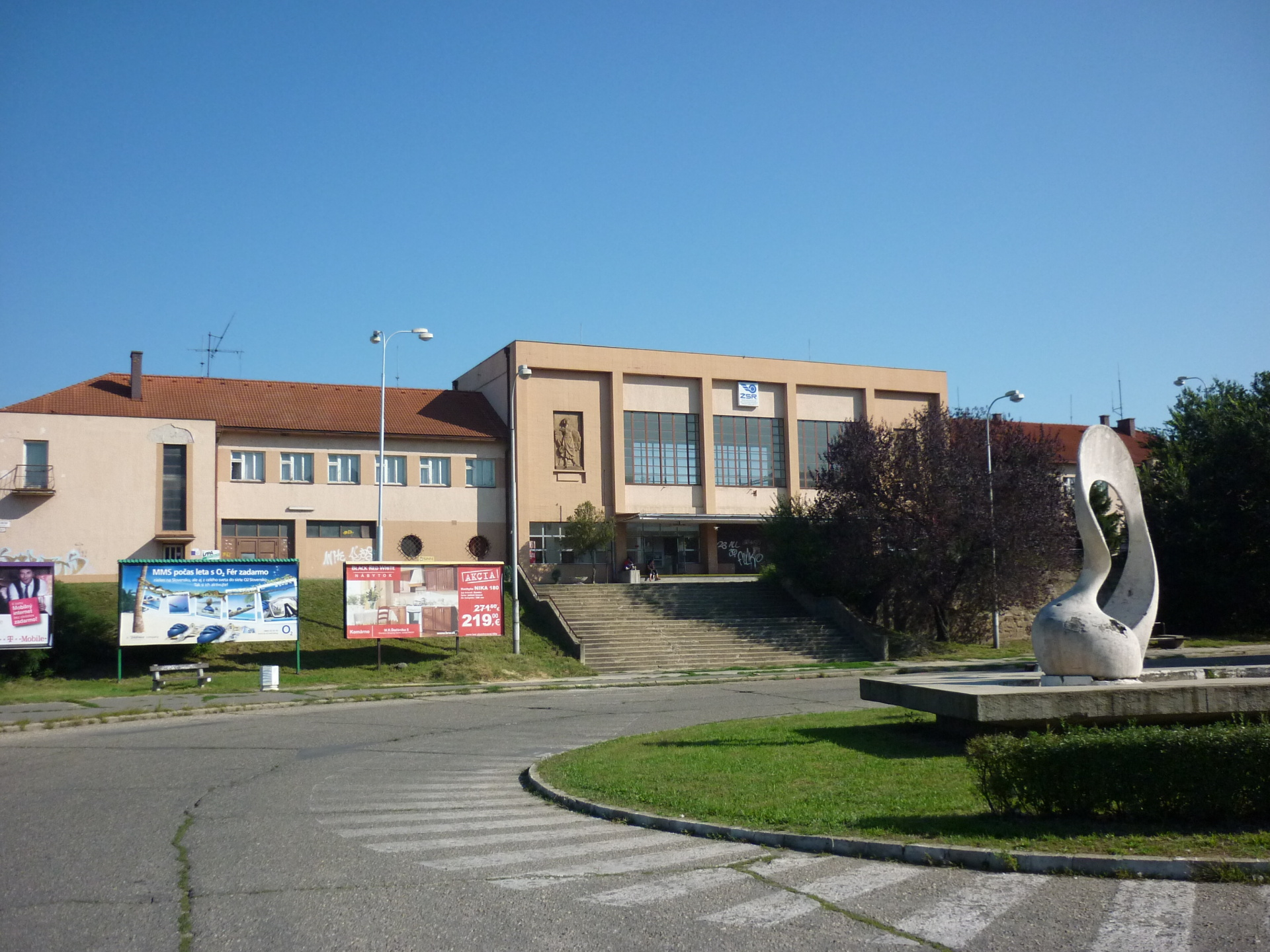
- Northern railway station of Komárno

Service
- Route number: 131

Technical
- Line length: 95 km
- Track gauge: 1435 mm
- Electrification: no AC
- Operating speed: 80 km/h max.

Bratislava–Dunajská Streda–Komárno railway line runs near Danube in the South-western part of Slovakia, in Žitný ostrov. Since 4 March 2012 it is operated by RegioJet.
