= Brackwede station =

Railway station in Bielefeld, Germany

Brackwede
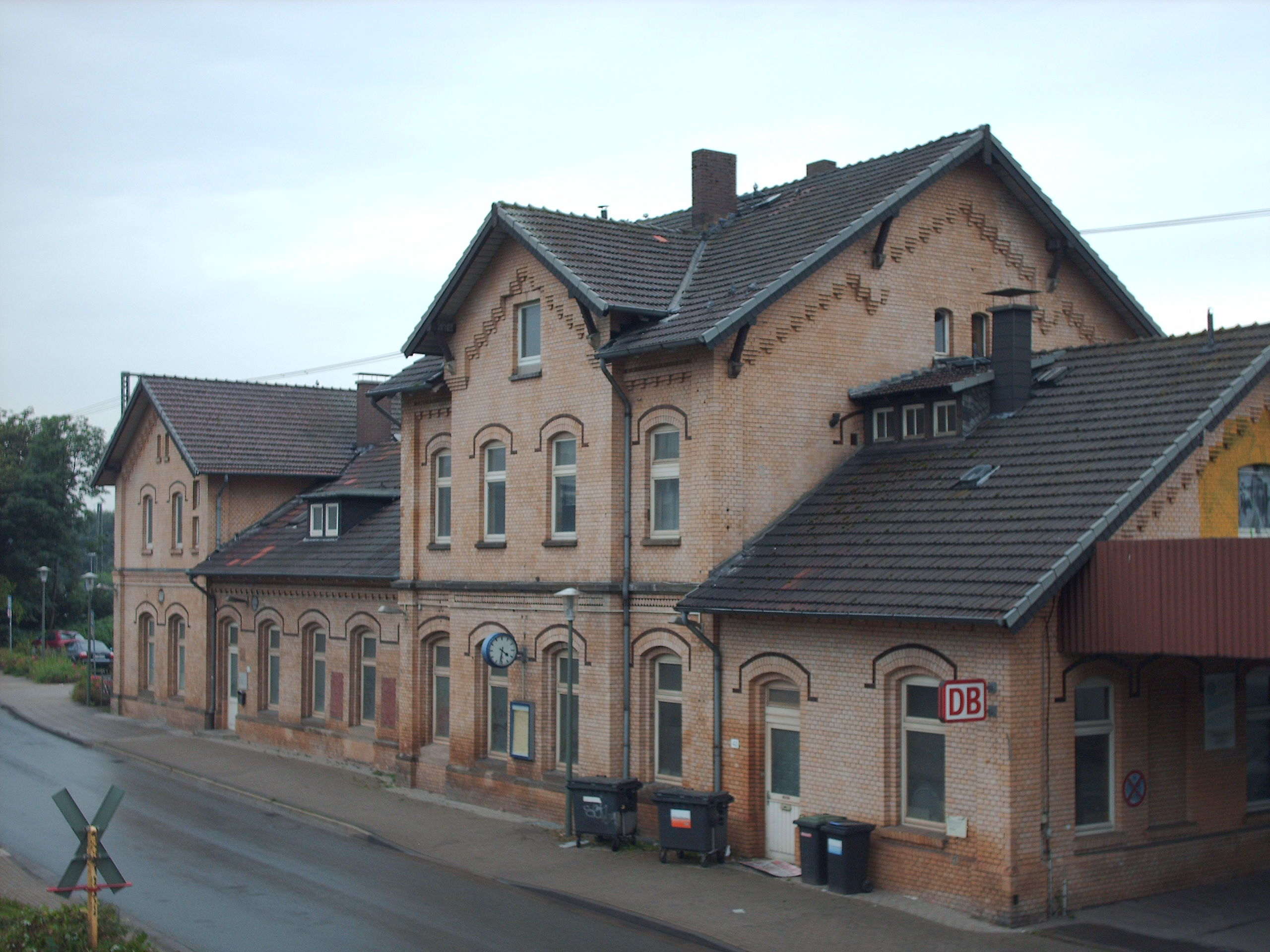

General information
- Location: Eisenbahnstr. 42, Brackwede, NRW; Germany
- Coordinates: 51°59′49″N 8°29′55″E
- Lines: Hamm–Minden railway (KBS 400); Osnabrück–Brackwede railway (KBS 402); Bielefeld–Paderborn railway (KBS 403)
- Platforms: 6

Construction
- Accessible: Yes

Other information
- Station code: 811
- DS100 code: EBWE
- IBNR: 8000048
- Category: 4
- Fare zone: Westfalentarif: 60011; VOS: Der Sechser (Westfalentarif transitional tariff)
- Website: www.bahnhof.de

History
- Opened: 15 October 1847

Services
Preceding station		Following station
Isselhorst-Avenwedde towards Münster Hbf	RB 67	Bielefeld Hbf Terminus
Isselhorst-Avenwedde towards Münster Hbf	RB 69	Bielefeld Hbf Terminus
Preceding station	NordWestBahn	Following station
Bielefeld-Senne towards Paderborn Hbf	RB 74	Bielefeld Hbf Terminus
Quelle-Kupferheide towards Osnabrück Hbf	RB 75	Bielefeld Hbf Terminus
Location

Brackwede station is the second most important station in the city of Bielefeld in the German state of North Rhine-Westphalia, after Bielefeld Hauptbahnhof. It is classified by Deutsche Bahn as a category 4 station. Train services are operated by NordWestBahn and Eurobahn.

== History ==
It was opened in 1847 with the opening of the Cologne-Minden trunk line.

In the course of the upgrade for Expo 2000 all stations were modernised along the line to Osnabrück. Only Brackwede station was not fully rehabilitated. The cost of the remedial work is estimated by DB Station&Service to cost about €4-5 million. DB Station&Service has installed dynamic train service indicators with funding from an economic stimulus package.

Until May 2019, the tracks were accessible via a pedestrian tunnel that led from Eisenbahnstraße under the railway line and the Ostwestfalendamm (urban expressway embankment, part of Bundesstraße 61) to the Brackwede natural swimming pool on the border with the Quelle district. The tunnel is the main connection for pedestrians and cyclists from Brackwede-Mitte to the Quelle district and to the natural swimming pool, which reopened in 2009, and has barrier-free access on both sides. The tunnel was renovated between 2019 and 2021. During the modernisation, barrier-free access with lifts was built to the platforms. The rear part of the tunnel that passes under the Ostwestfalendamm was embellished by young people with a continuous piece of graffiti showing the "skyline" of Brackwede.

== Station area ==
The station has a parking area. In addition, covered bike racks and lockable bike boxes are available.

Close-by located next to the Ostwestfalendamm and the natural pool, are a mosque of the Turkish-Azerbaijani Cultural Association, a junkyard, a Turkish/Russian supermarket, Lutter valley including the Lutterkolk (pond) and the sources of the Lutter as well as the Gestamp GMF Umformtechnik (formerly the ThyssenKrupp Umformtechnik) company.

== Rail services ==
The following Regionalbahn services stopped at Brackwede station in 2025:

Line	Name	Route	Operator
RB 67	Der Warendorfer	Bielefeld – Brackwede – Gütersloh – Warendorf – Münster (Westf)	Eurobahn
RB 69	Ems-Börde-Bahn	Bielefeld – Brackwede – Hamm (Westf) – Münster (Westf)	Eurobahn
RB 75	Senne-Bahn	Bielefeld – Brackwede – Sennestadt – Paderborn	NordWestBahn
RB 75	Haller Willem	Bielefeld – Brackwede – Halle (Westf) – Osnabrück	NordWestBahn

== Stadtbahn and bus connections ==
Services on Bielefeld Stadtbahn line 1 stop 300 metres to the north east of the station on Gütersloh Straße at a stop called Bahnhof Brackwede, which is reached via a staircase that is not accessible for the disabled, although there is a longer route that is accessible. The station is also served by the following bus routes.

Line	Route	Operator	Frequency
48	Bielefeld Hbf – Quelle – Steinhagen (Westf.) – Brockhagen – Versmold	go.on	6 per day
80	Bielefeld Hbf – Verl – Neuenkirchen – Rietberg – Mastholte – Lippstadt	TWE Veolia Verkehr Niedersachsen / Westfalen GmbH	4 per day
83	Bielefeld Hbf – Senne – Sende/Verl – Schloß Holte	Wittler & Voßhans	2 per day
87	Bielefeld Hbf – Ummeln – Holtkamp – Isselhorst – Gütersloh	Stadtwerke Gütersloh	Hourly
88	Bielefeld Hbf – Quelle – Steinhagen (Westf.) – Amshausen – Künsebeck – Halle (Westf.)	go.on	Hourly
95	Bielefeld Hbf – Brackwede – Ummeln – Isselhorst – Gütersloh	bvo DB Ostwestfalenbus	Every 30 or 60 minutes
187	Bielefeld Radrennbahn – Ummeln – Miele-Werke – Gütersloh (service for Miele company workers)	Stadtwerke Gütersloh	2 per day

It has long been planned for bus lines running on the Brackwerd city ring to pass the station and to end at a terminus in the station district (Bahnhofsviertel), in order to improve connections between trains and buses. Since the relocation of the bus route 94 to Brackweder Kirche, however, only two bus routes operate on this route.

== Bielefeld International Bus Station ==
On 30 March 2009, the previous three stops for international long-distance bus services in Bielefeld (Hauptbahnhof, Sennestadt Ratio-Markt and Kesselbrink) were brought together at Brackwerd station. This mainly offers connections to Poland and Eastern Europe (including the Baltic states), but also to Western and Southern European countries (France, Portugal, England, Belgium). The domestic long-distance buses to Magdeburg and Berlin (Berlin Linien Bus GmbH) run via the Hauptbahnhof. For the relocation of the bus station to the central part of the Brackwerd station building, it was renovated and equipped with a waiting room for travellers as well as toilets. A travel agency and a newspaper stand are also located in the station building.
