= Osnabrück-Sutthausen station =

Railway station in Sutthausen, Germany

Osnabrück-Sutthausen

General information
- Location: Osnabrück, Lower Saxony; Germany
- Coordinates: 52°13′55″N 8°01′17″E
- System: Through station
- Line: Osnabrück–Brackwede railway (KBS 402)
- Platforms: 1

Other information
- Station code: n/a
- DS100 code: HSUN
- Fare zone: VOS: 100 (VOS Plus tickets accepted on RB75 between Osnabrück Hbf and Dissen-Bad Rothenfelde); Westfalentarif: 91000 (VOS transitional tariff)

Services
Preceding station	NordWestBahn	Following station
Osnabrück Hbf Terminus	RB 75	Oesede towards Bielefeld Hbf
Location

Osnabrück-Sutthausen is a railway station located in Osnabrück, Germany. The station is on the Osnabrück–Brackwede railway. The train services are operated by NordWestBahn.

== Train services ==
The station is served by the following services:

- Local services RB 75 Osnabrück - Halle (Westf) - Bielefeld

== Bus services ==
There is a bus service to Osnabrück.
