= Kloster Oesede station =

Railway station in Georgsmarienhütte, Germany

Kloster Oesede

General information
- Location: Osnabrück, Lower Saxony; Germany
- Coordinates: 52°12′02″N 8°06′42″E
- System: Through station
- Line: Osnabrück–Brackwede railway (KBS 402)
- Platforms: 1

Other information
- Station code: n/a
- DS100 code: HKOE
- Fare zone: VOS: 411 (VOS Plus tickets accepted on RB75 between Osnabrück Hbf and Dissen-Bad Rothenfelde); Westfalentarif: 94110 (VOS transitional tariff)

Services
Preceding station	NordWestBahn	Following station
Oesede towards Osnabrück Hbf	RB 75	Wellendorf towards Bielefeld Hbf
Location

Kloster Oesede is a railway station located in Kloster Oesede (Georgsmarienhütte), Germany. The station is on the Osnabrück–Brackwede railway. The train services are operated by NordWestBahn.

== Train services ==
The station is served by the following services:

- Local services RB 75 Osnabrück - Halle (Westf) - Bielefeld
