= Bombardier Talent =

Multiple unit railcar

Talent
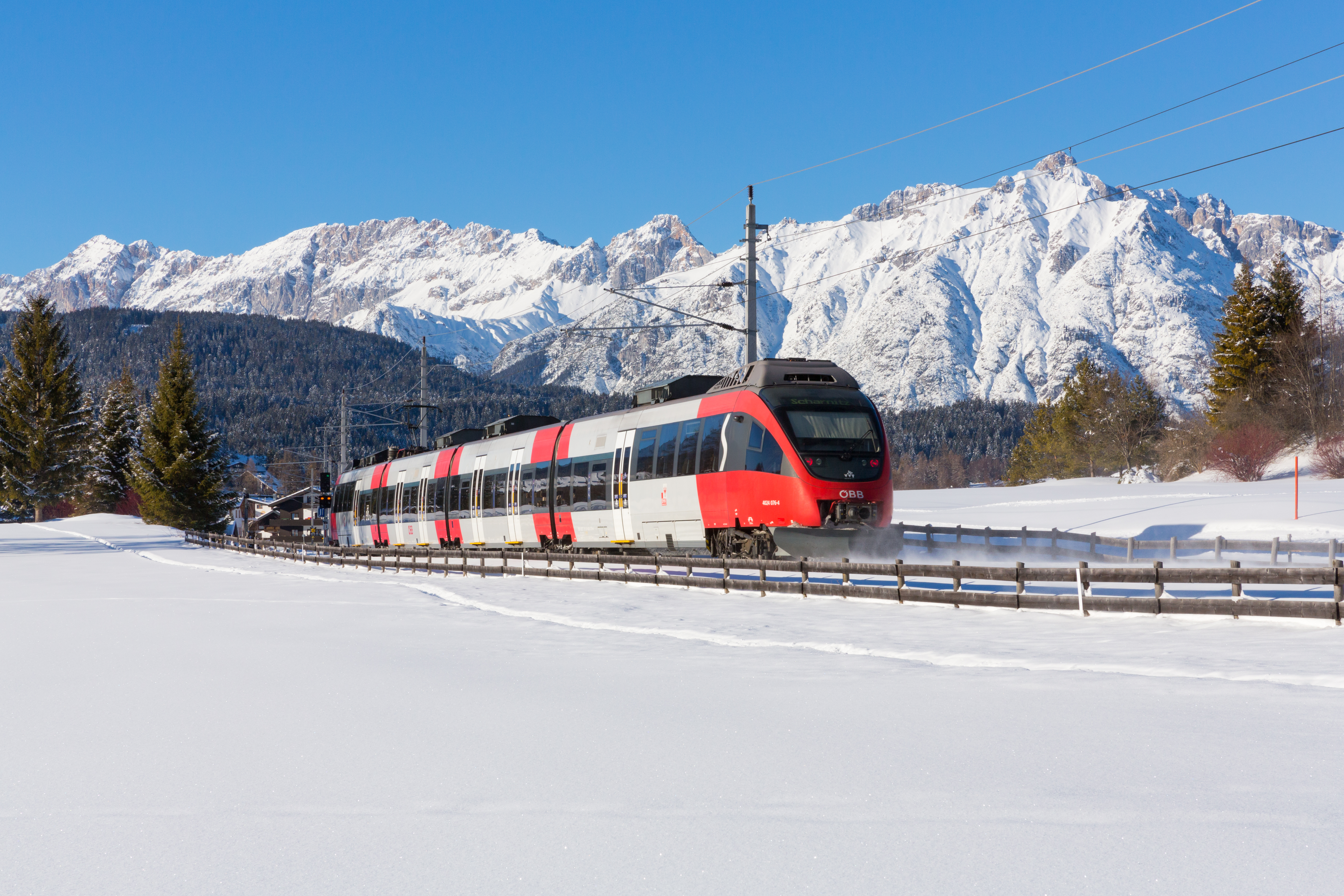
- A Talent ÖBB 4024 EMU.
- Manufacturer: Bombardier Transportation
- Designer: Alexander Neumeister
- Constructed: 1996-2008
- Number built: 830+
- Successor: Talent 2

Specifications
- Train length: 34.61–66.87 m (113 ft 7 in – 219 ft 5 in)
- Maximum speed: 140 km/h (90 mph)
- Weight: 57–116 t (56–114 long tons; 63–128 short tons)
- Axle load: 12.8–14.1 t (12.6–13.9 long tons; 14.1–15.5 short tons)
- Power output: 630 kW (840 hp) (diesel-mechanical); 1,100 kW (1,500 hp) (diesel-electric); 1,520 kW (2,040 hp) (electric)
- Transmission: Diesel-mechanical or Diesel-electric
- Electric systems: 15 kV 16.7 Hz AC and 25 kV 50 Hz AC, both from overhead catenary
- Current collection: Pantograph (electric)
- UIC classification: B'2'B'; B'2'2'B'; Bo'2'2'2'Bo'

The Talent is a multiple unit light train manufactured by Bombardier that was developed by Waggonfabrik Talbot in Aachen shortly before the company was acquired by Bombardier in 1995. The name Talent is an acronym in German for TALbot LEichter Nahverkehrs-Triebwagen (in English, Talbot light suburban self-propelled car).

It comes in a number of variants, including high-floor, low-floor, diesel-mechanical, diesel-hydraulic, diesel-electric, electric, and tilting, and in lengths of two, three, or four carriages. As with most multiple-unit trains, Talent units can run individually, or be coupled together to form longer trains.

== Specifications ==
Classified as heavy rail according to UIC standards, the Talent is a two-, three- or four-part articulated railcar with Jacobs bogies. Partially as a result of this, the interior of an entire unit is essentially a single, long cabin; it is possible to see or walk from end to end without opening doors or passing through narrower gangways. The sharing of bogies also means that a Talent unit cannot be easily disassembled or rearranged without the assistance of a railway yard. In those variants whose floor is 590 mm (23.2 in) above the rails, this means that the articulation floor is raised, but with ramp access, since it needs to be higher than the wheel diameter, above rail level. In the variants with 800 and 960 mm (31.5 and 37.8 in) floor height, the floor is flat from the first door to the last. The endsections have a raised floor in all variants, because the traction equipment installed underneath requires more space than unpowered bogies. The optional tilting system (called ContRoll) is unique: no swinging bolster is required between the bogie and the car body, but hydraulic cylinders, fitted between the anti roll bar system and the carbody, directly actuate the tilting.

== Service ==
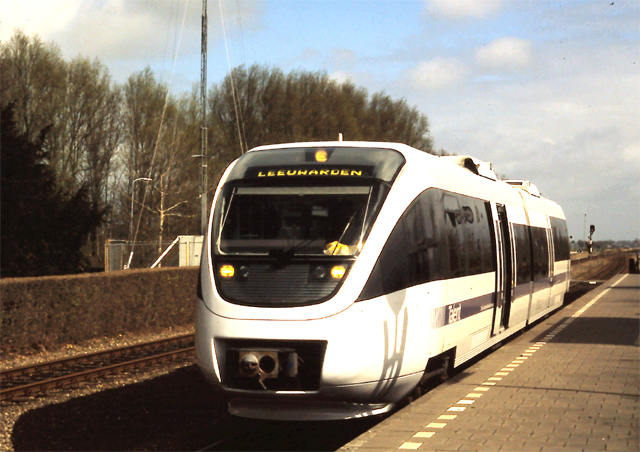
A Bombardier Talent diesel multiple unit prototype at Grijpskerk railway station in September 1997

After a prototype was presented in 1994, the first Talents entered service in 1996. They are used by mainline railways in Germany, Austria and Norway. More than 260 are in service worldwide.

In a more unusual use, three diesel Talents identical to Deutsche Bahn's class 643 once formed the fleet for Ottawa's O-Train Line 2, a diesel light rail transit line running entirely within the City of Ottawa. Line 2 shares a lightly used freight railway line. As the Talent is not certified for concurrent shared-track operation with freight trains in North America, freight traffic is not permitted on Line 2's route while passenger services are running. Although it is still legally classified as a main-line railway, Transport Canada allow O-Train Line 2 to use One-Person Train Operation, with fares collected through a proof-of-payment system. In March 2015, all three Talent units were replaced by Alstom Coradia LINT diesel units.

The Talent has now been superseded by the Bombardier Talent 2 and Talent 3.

=== Operators ===
Deutsche Bahn Talent train in Cologne.

Ostmecklenburgische Eisenbahn (OME) Talent train in Germany

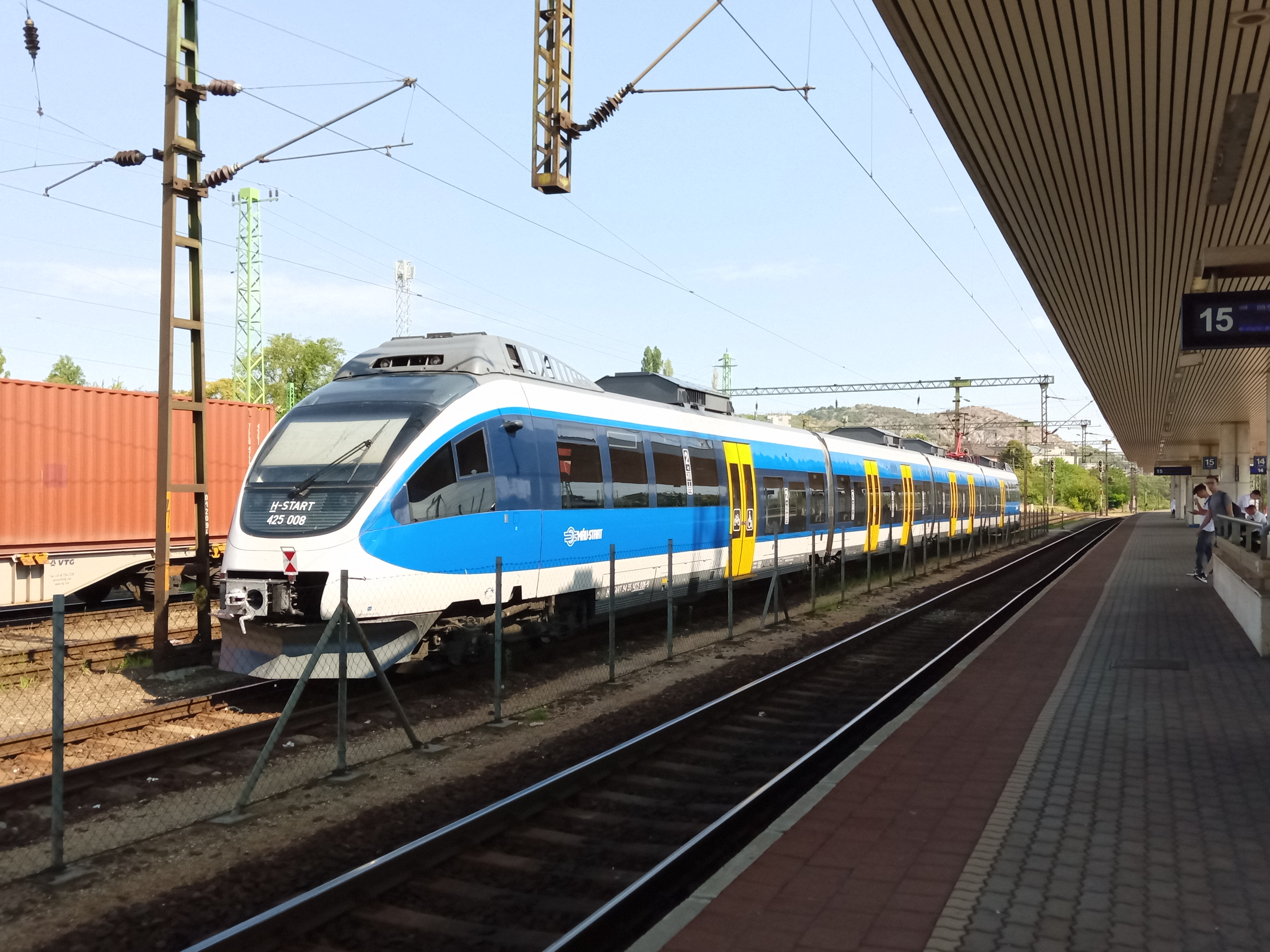
A MÁV Class 425 Talent train in the new livery

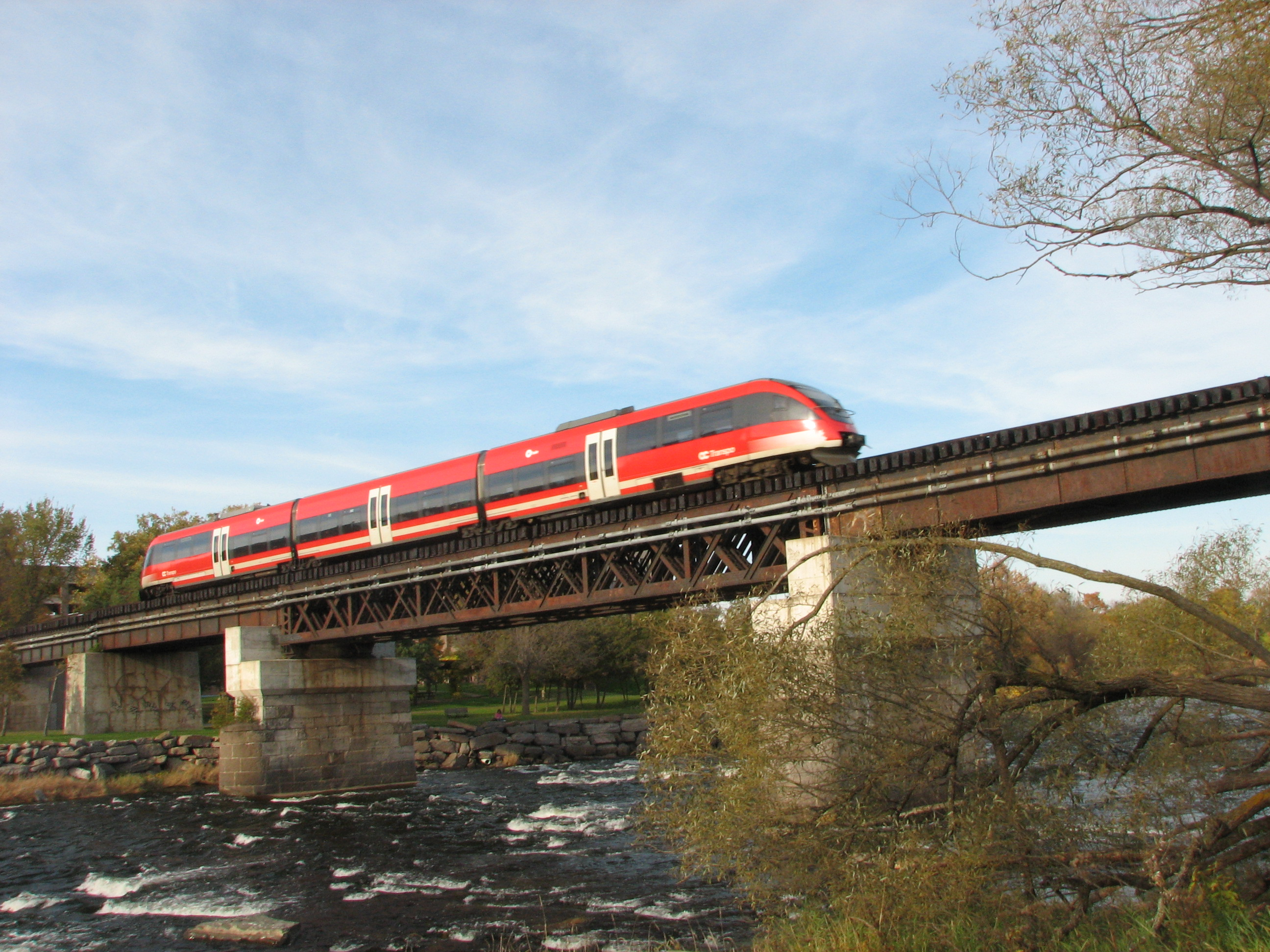
Line 2 train in Ottawa, Ontario, Canada

- Austria
  - Austrian Federal Railways ÖBB Class 4023, 4024, 4124
    - Salzburg S-Bahn
    - Vienna S-Bahn
    - Tyrol S-Bahn
    - Styria S-Bahn
    - Vorarlberg S-Bahn
    - Carinthia S-Bahn
    - Upper Austria S-Bahn
- Germany
  - Deutsche Bahn (DB Regio) Class 643/943, 644/944
    - DB Regio Baden-Württemberg
    - DB Regio NRW
    - DB Regio Mitte
  - Transdev Germany
    - Nord-Ostsee-Bahn
    - NordWestBahn
    - Niederbarnimer Eisenbahn
    - Ostmecklenburgische Eisenbahn
    - Bayerische Oberlandbahn
  - eurobahn
  - Rhenus Veniro
- Hungary
  - Hungarian State Railways MÁV Class 425
- Norway
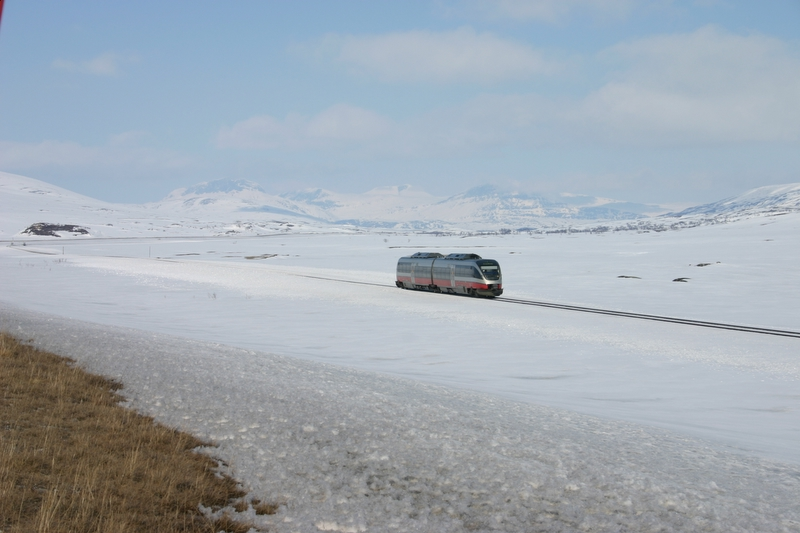
  Bombardier Talent NSB Class 93 at the Nordland Line crossing Arctic Circle in Norway
  - SJ Norge (see NSB Class 93 for details)
    - Nordland Line
    - Rauma Line
    - Røros Line
- Romania
  - Transferoviar Călători 643/943 (ex-Regiobahn), 644/944 (ex DB-Regio)

=== Former operators ===
- Canada
  - Ottawa O-Train, Trillium Line
- Germany
  - Regiobahn
  - Dortmund-Märkische Eisenbahn
- Slovakia
  - RegioJet (leased by Alpha Trains)
    - Bratislava–Dunajská Streda–Komarno railway

== See also ==
- BLS RABe 525
