= Dissen-Bad Rothenfelde station =

Railway station in Dissen, Germany

Dissen-Bad Rothenfelde
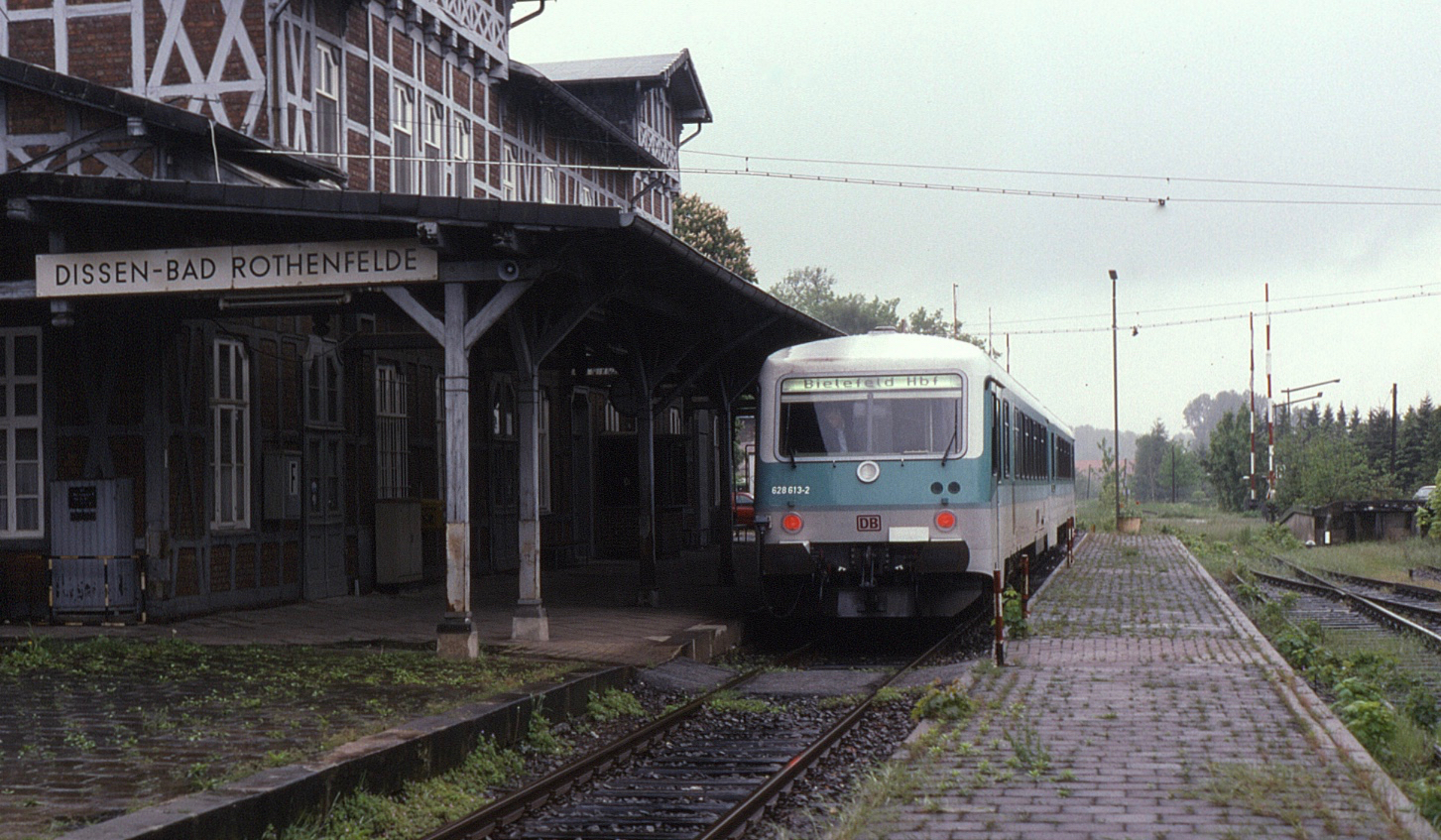
- Dissen-Rothenfelde station in 1996

General information
- Location: Dissen am Teutoburger Wald, Lower Saxony; Germany
- Coordinates: 52°06′43″N 8°11′05″E
- Line: Osnabrück–Brackwede railway (KBS 402)
- Platforms: 1

Other information
- Station code: 1227
- DS100 code: HDBR
- Category: 6
- Fare zone: VOS: 419 (VOS Plus tickets accepted up to Osnabrück Hbf); Westfalentarif: 94192 (VOS transitional tariff)
- Website: www.bahnhof.de

Services
Preceding station	NordWestBahn	Following station
Hilter towards Osnabrück Hbf	RB 75	Westbarthausen towards Bielefeld Hbf
Location

Dissen-Bad Rothenfelde is a railway station located in Dissen am Teutoburger Wald and close to Bad Rothenfelde, Germany. It was originally built as Hildesheim station in 1846, but was taken down and re-erected in Dissen-Bad Rothenfelde in the 1880s. The station is on the Osnabrück–Brackwede railway. The train services are operated by NordWestBahn.

== Train services ==
The station is served by the following services:

- Local services RB 75 Osnabrück - Halle (Westf) - Bielefeld
