= Giehler =

Giehler may refer to:

- Torben Giehler, German painter
- Giehler Bach, upstream name of the Hamme river in north-west Germany
