= University Hospitals of the Ruhr-University of Bochum =

Universitätsklinikum der Ruhr-Universität Bochum
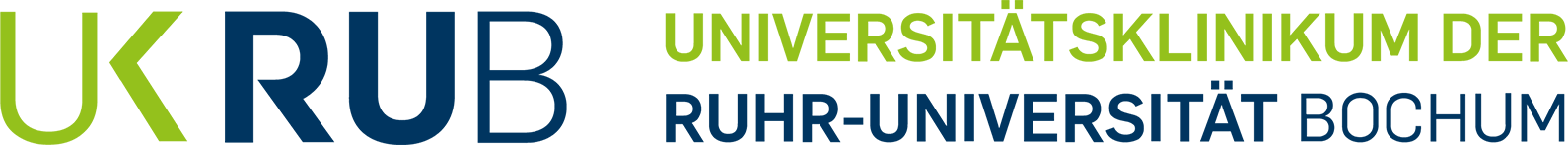

Geography
- Location: Several locations in Bochum, Hattingen, Herne and Bad Oeynhausen, North Rhine-Westphalia, Germany
- Coordinates: 51.464231°N 7.327411°E

Organisation
- Care system: Statutory health insurance (GKV), German Social Accident Insurance, and Private
- Type: Teaching
- Affiliated university: Ruhr-Universität Bochum

Services
- Emergency department: Emergency departments available (Notfallaufnahme) in several houses
- Beds: 3,643 (2013)

Helipads
- Helipad: Yes

History
- Opened: 2008

Links
- Website: www.uk.rub.de
- Lists: Hospitals in Germany

The University hospitals of the Ruhr University of Bochum, German Universitätsklinikum der Ruhr-Universität Bochum, abbreviated UK RUB is a syndicate of six university hospitals and associated facilities of the Ruhr University of Bochum. Founded in 2008 by the merger of formally independent hospitals the UK RUB is now a major provider of health in the Ruhr Metropolitan Region treating over 400,000 patients per year with a strong commitment to research and teaching.

== History ==
The Universitätsklinikum der Ruhr-Universität Bochum emerged from the Bochum Model, where several non state-owned hospitals in Bochum and the surrounding metropolitan area were appointed as teaching hospitals. This appointment was first intended to be a temporary solution to financial shortages and political problems in the development of the medical faculty in Bochum in the 1970s, especially after the Universitätsklinikum Essen was spun off from the Ruhr University in 1972 and integrated into the newly formed Universität-Gesamthochschule Essen.

In 1998 the cooperation between appointed hospitals and Ruhr University was permanently established. This was in September 2008 the basis for the foundation of the Verband Klinikum der Ruhr-Universität Bochum with coordinating tasks in clinical, scientific and didactical fields.

== Locations ==
=== University teaching hospitals ===
- Bergmannsheil University Hospitals Bochum
- Knappschaftskrankenhaus Bochum-Langendreer
- Katholisches Klinikum Bochum
  - St. Josef-Hospital Bochum
  - St. Elisabeth-Hospital Bochum
  - St. Maria Hilf-Krankenhaus Bochum
  - Klinik Blankenstein, Hattingen
- Marienhospital Herne, Herne
- LWL-Universitätsklinik Bochum
- Heart and Diabetes Center North Rhine-Westphalia (Herz- und Diabeteszentrum Nordrhein-Westfalen), Bad Oeynhausen

=== Additional hospitals and institutes ===
- Klinik für Psychosomatische Medizin und Psychotherapie des LWL-Universitätsklinikums der Ruhr-Universität Bochum
- LWL-Universitätsklinik Hamm, Hamm
- Institut für Prävention und Arbeitsmedizin der Deutschen Gesetzlichen Unfallversicherung (research institute for prevention and occupational medicine / IPA)
- Institut für Pathologie der Ruhr-Universität Bochum (institute for pathology)

=== External academic teaching hospitals ===
- Knappschaftskrankenhaus Dortmund
- Allgemeines Krankenhaus Hagen
- Knappschaftskrankenhaus Recklinghausen
- Prosper-Hospital Recklinghausen
- Marien-Hospital Witten

=== Competence centers based on interdisciplinary cooperation ===
- RUCC (Ruhr-University Comprehensive Cancer Center)
- Lung cancer center
- Ruhr center for intestinal medicine
- Breast cancer centre Bochum-Herne
- Trauma centre
- Muskelzentrum Ruhrgebiet (Ruhr muscle center)
- Center for heart and circulatory diseases
- Teleradiology network
- ECMO centre
- epilepsy center
- Skin cancer center
- Multiple sclerosis center
- Pancreas center
- Transplantation center
- Vein center
- Centre for sexual health

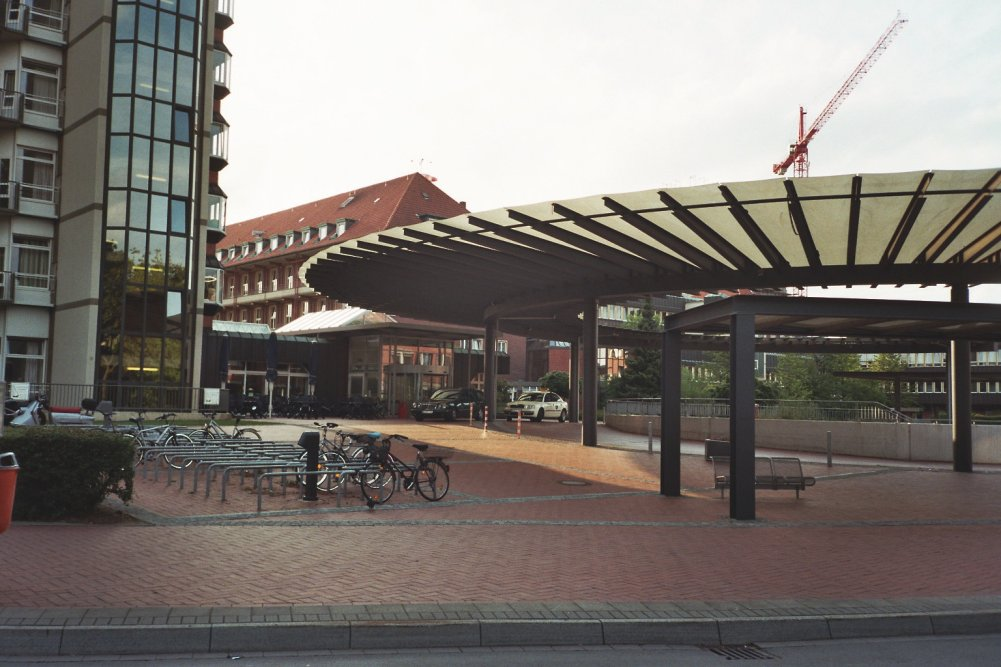
Main entry of Bergmannsheil University Hospitals

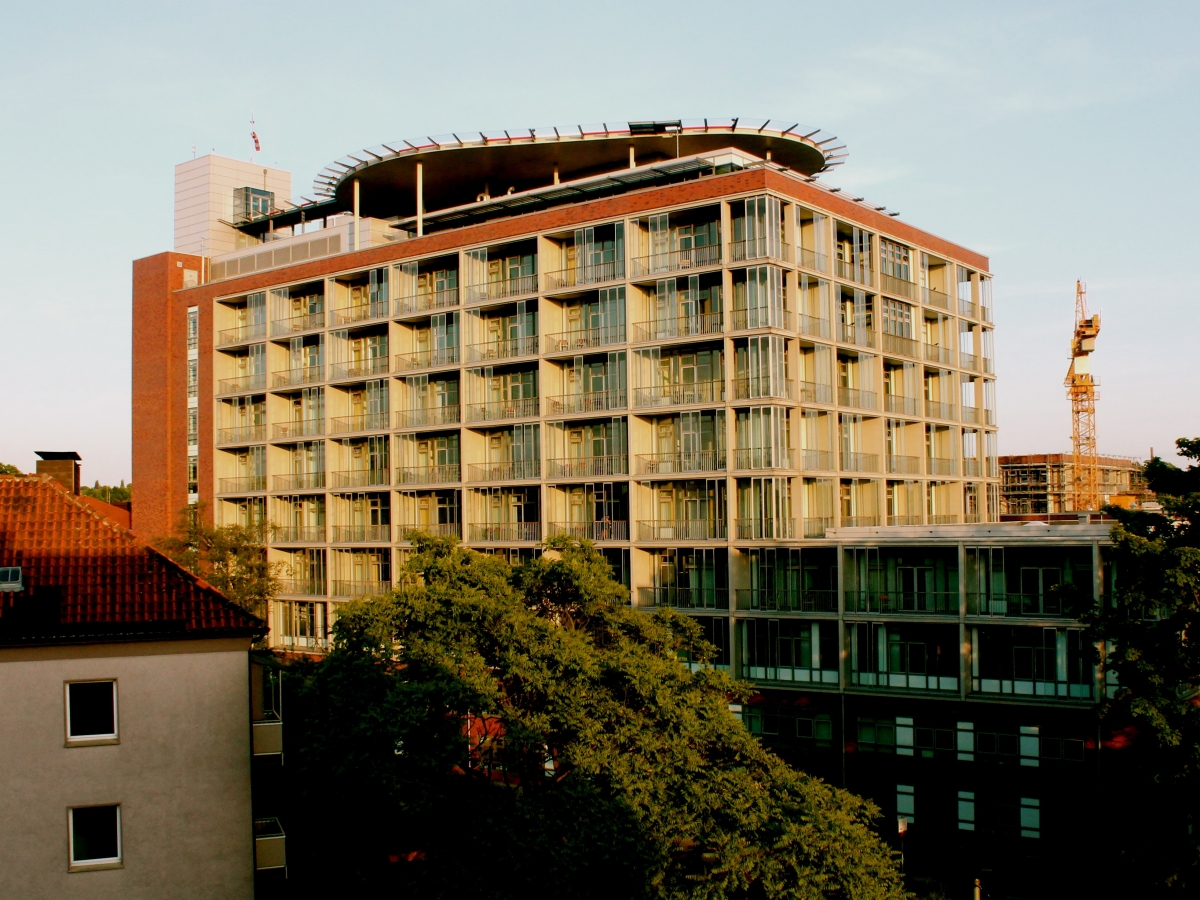
Bergmannsheil (building 3)

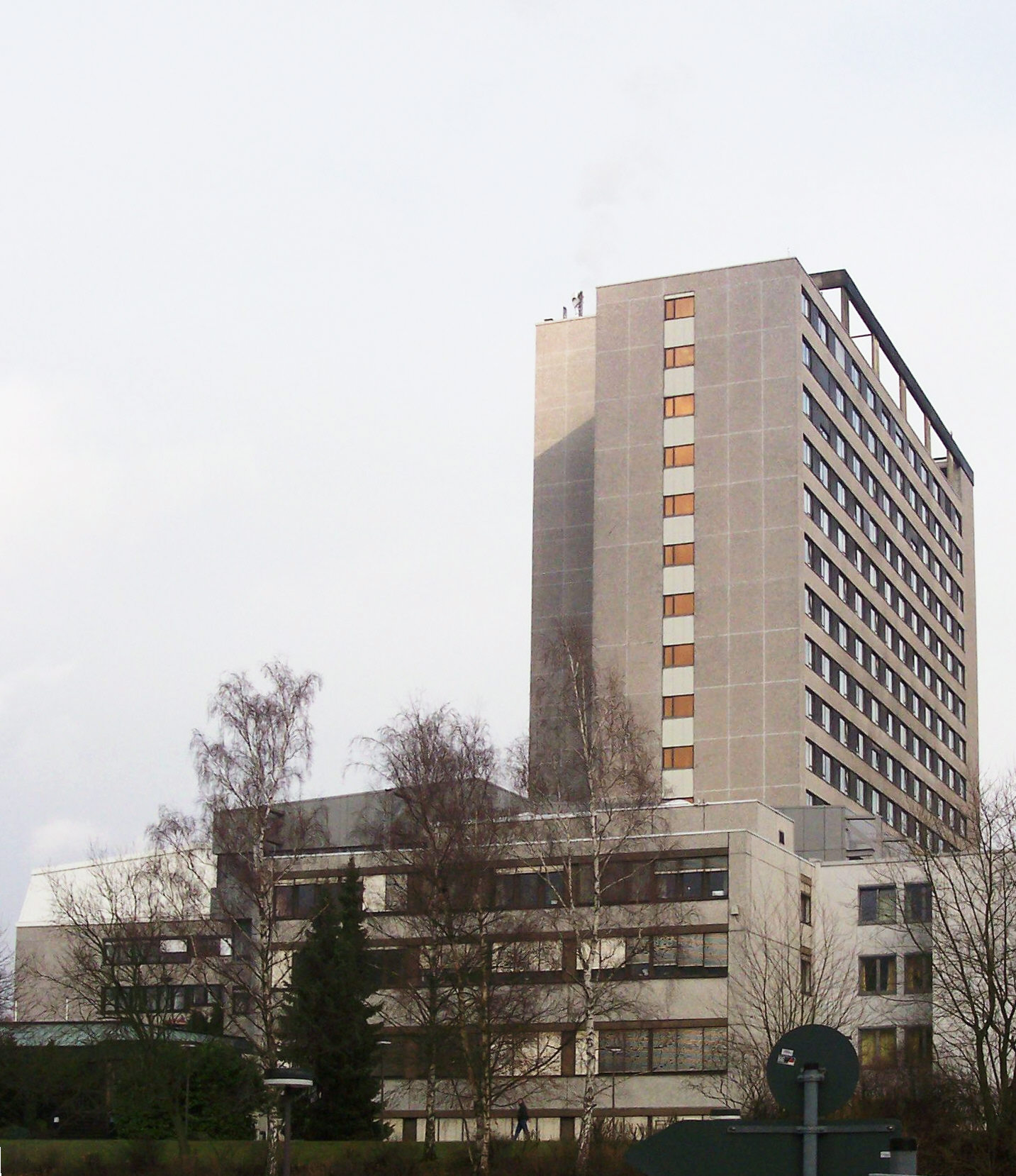
Knappschaftskrankenhaus Bochum-Langendreer

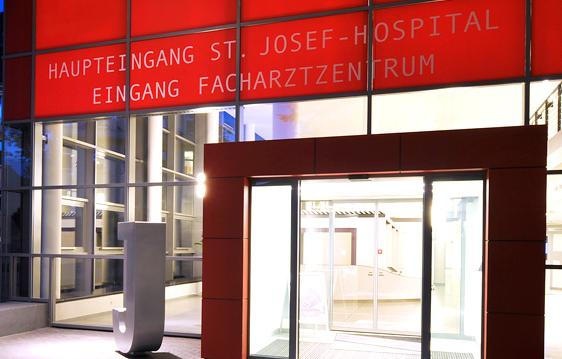
Main entry of St.Josef-Hospital

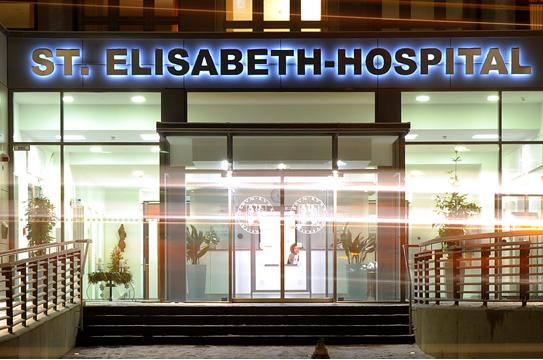
Main entry of St. Elisabeth-Hospital

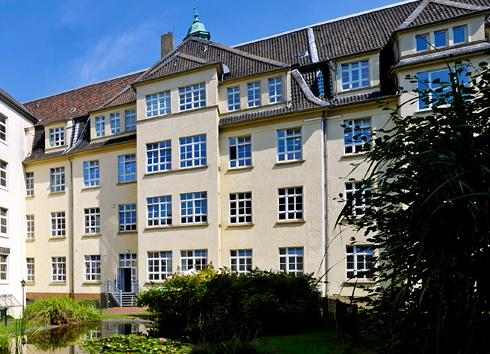
Maria-Hilf Krankenhaus

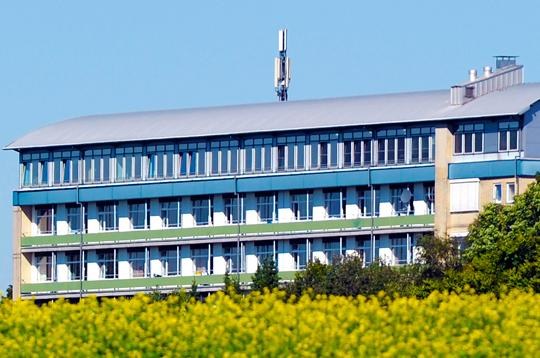
Klinik Blankenstein in Hattingen

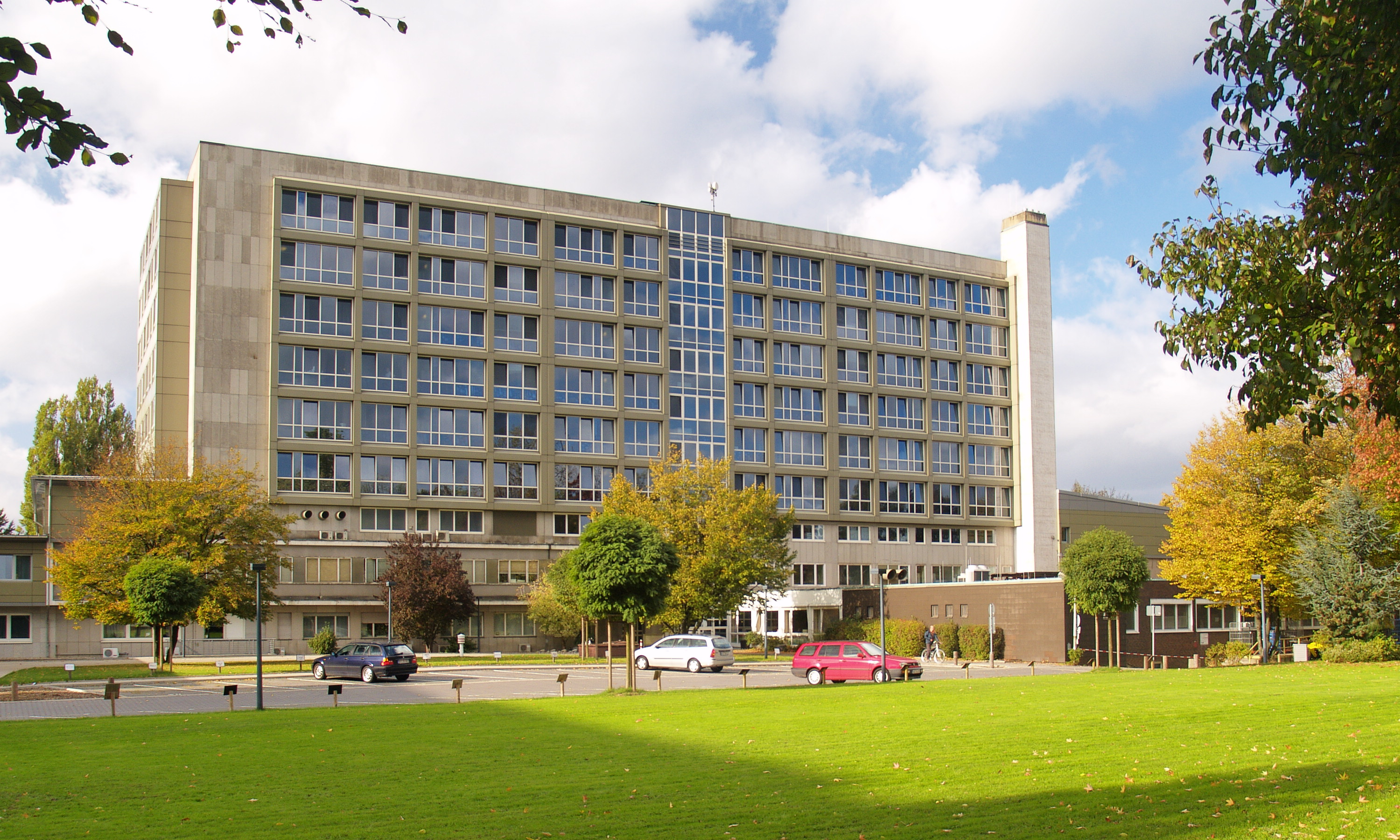
Marienhospital in Herne

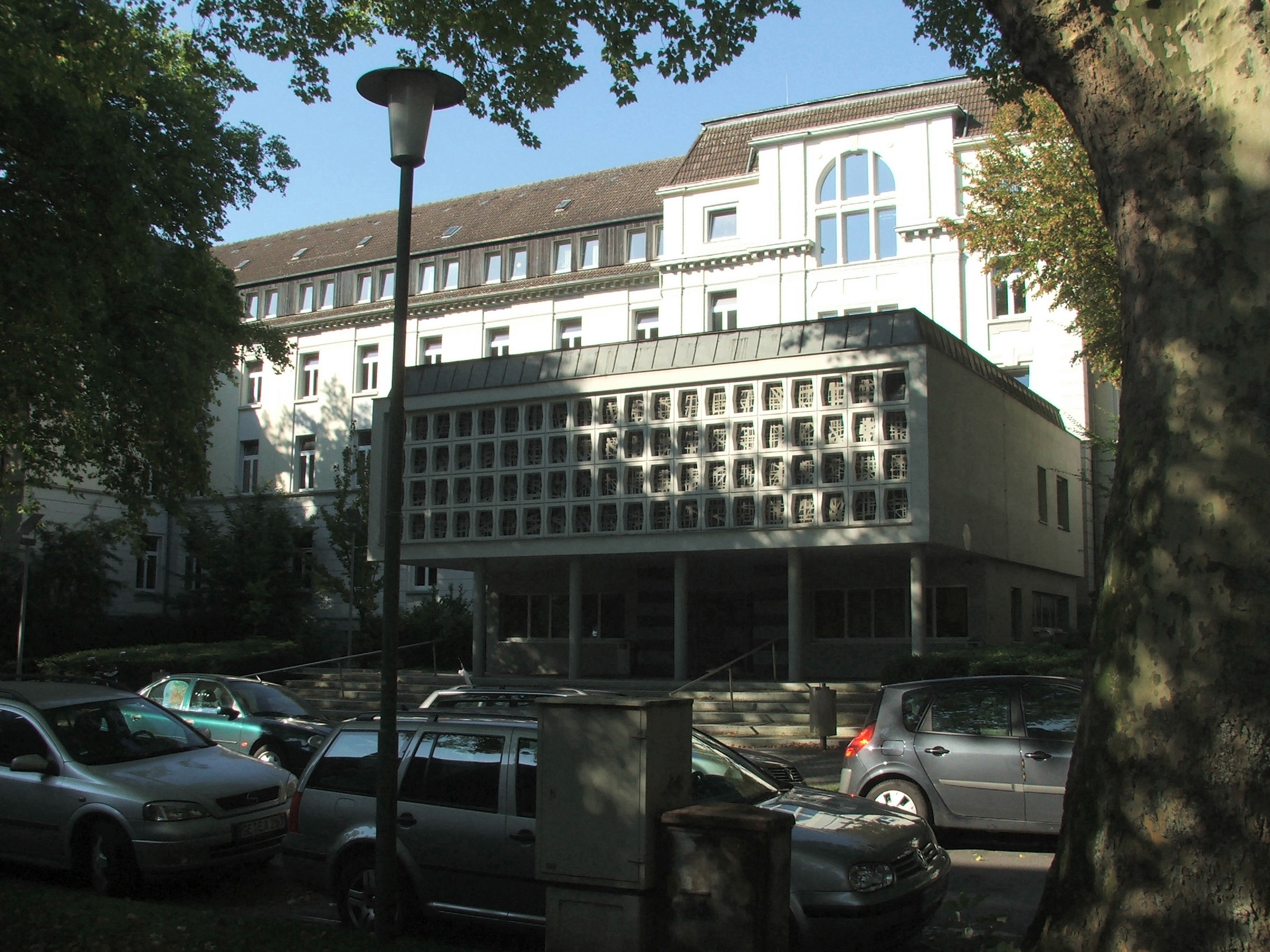
LWL-Universitätsklinik Bochum

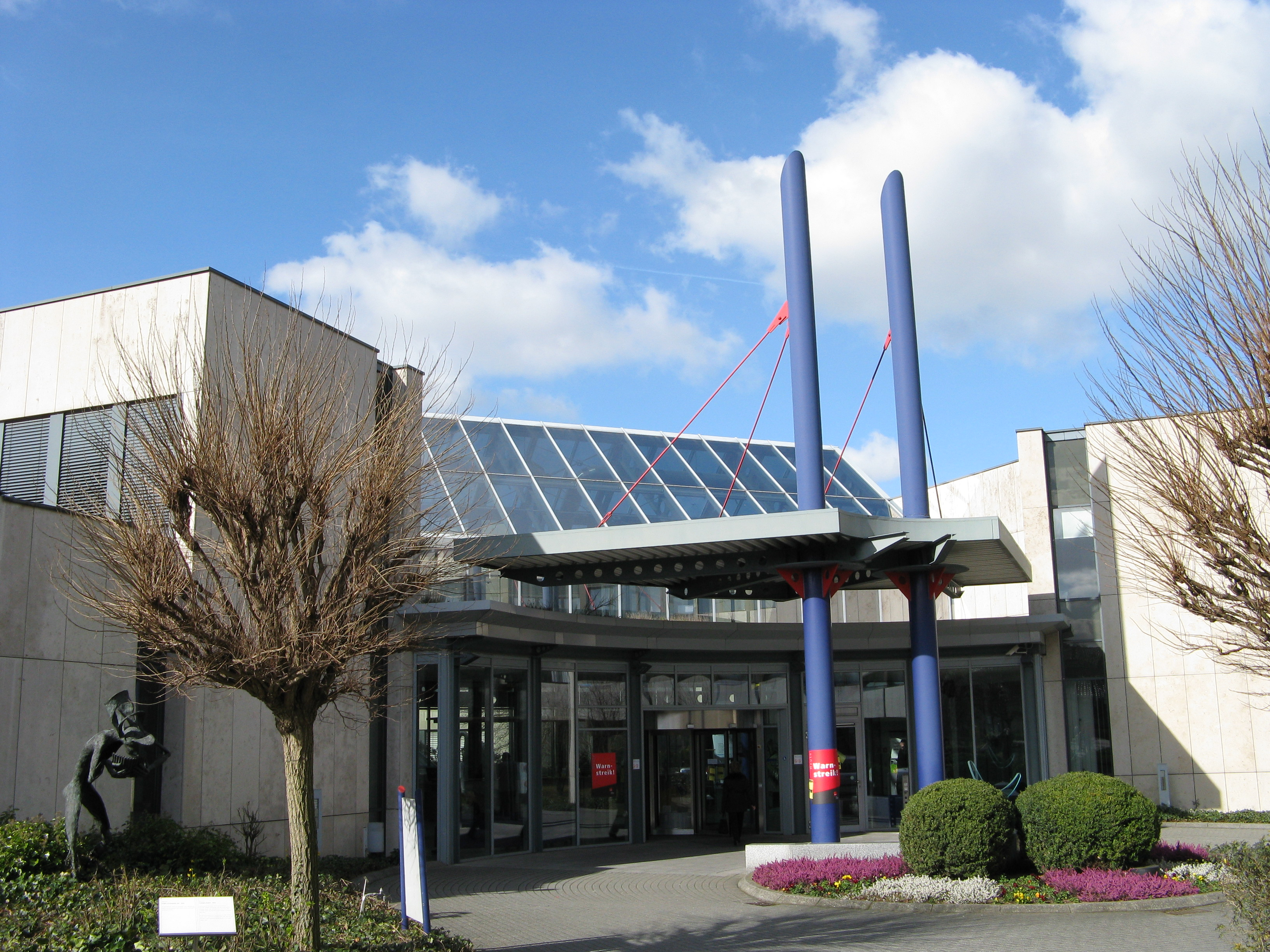
Main entry of Herz- und Diabeteszentrums Nordrhein-Westfalen
