= Roland Pröll =

German musician (born 1949)

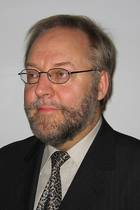
Roland Pröll

Roland Pröll (born 11 June 1949 in Unna, North Rhine-Westphalia) was a German pianist, conductor, composer, musicologist, and professor of music.

== Biography ==
Roland Pröll had his first piano lessons at the age of 5. When he was 11 he became a student of Dieter Wollert at the Dortmund Music university in Germany. There he passed his diploma with distinction.

After this he continued his studies in Paris at the Conservatoire National Supérieur de Musique with Messiaen, Loriod, Sancan, Dubois, and other famous teachers. As well as studying the piano, he also studied other musical disciplines such as conducting and composing. The taught method of Solfège was a formative influence for him, especially in France, leading to his support for the dissemination of this method all over the world.

He finished his studies in musicology at the Sorbonne in Paris and became a Ph.D., (Doctorat d`Université). After this he became a student of Arthur Rubinstein and worked with other famous musicians.

He gained many first prizes in international competitions, and gave concerts all over the world. He was a guest of Sydney Opera House, Berlin Philharmonie and others. His fame spread, especially in Japan and Korea, and more recently in China. Since 2005 until his death, he worked with the Murcia Symphony Orchestra, and he went on tour with them through Spain. He recorded many CDs and made many special recordings for television and radio all over the world.

He taught at the Dortmund Music university as a professor until 1996 and he led the institute from 1988 to 1990 as dean. From 1999 to 2002 he was dean of the Ibach-Academy in Schwelm, Germany, which was founded in co-operation with him.

In the time period from 2006 to the middle of 2007 Roland Pröll worked as a musical leader of the non-profit association Viva la Musica e. V. in Bad Oeynhausen, Germany. Because of decrease in demand the association dissolved at the end of June 2007. Since that time Pröll works as a tutor and artist for the music agency "Musikagentour Viva" in Bad Oeynhausen, Germany.

In 1987 he founded the international Schubert-Competition in Dortmund, which is today one of the great piano competitions. (Today's leader is Arnulf von Arnim).

Roland Pröll held professorships for piano and chamber music at the Atsugi Showa University of Music in Tokyo, Japan, at the Conservatorio Superior de Musica in Murcia, Spain, and at the Conservatory in Osnabrück, Germany.

He gave masterclasses and concerts all over the world.

Pröll died in Dortmund on December 3, 2025, after a long illness.

== Discography (summary) ==
- W.A. Mozart: Concert for piano and orchestra KV 413 and KV 414 a quattro (with Arnsberger Streichtrio)
- W.A. Mozart: Chamber music from three generations of Mozart (Father, W.A., Son) (with Manfred Hörr, violin, Christiane Hörr, viola und Peter Hörr, cello)
- L. v. Beethoven: Piano sonatas op. 110 und op. 111
- F. Schubert: "Die Winterreise" (with Berthold Schmidt, tenor)
- F. Schubert, C. Debussy, J. Brahms and G. Fauré: Cello sonatas (with Peter Hörr, cello)
- J. Brahms: Piano concerto No. 1 (d-minor, op. 15) (with the "Junge Symphoniker" Werner Seiss, conductor)
- J. Brahms: Violin sonatas No. 1 (op. 78), No. 2 (op. 100), No. 3 (op. 108) and Scherzo c-minor (oop.) (with Ismene Then-Berg, violin)
- J. Brahms: Horn-Trio Es-Dur (op. 40), Violin sonata No. 2 (op. 100) and Scherzo c-minor (oop.) (with Gerhard Reich, violin)
- J. Brahms: Variationen und Fugen über ein Thema von Händel (op. 24) and Vier Balladen (op. 10)
- R. Schumann: Fantasie in C (Op. 17), M. Ravel: Miroirs
- M. Ravel: Pavane pour une infante Défunte, P.I. Tschaikowsky: Scherzo from Symphony No. 1 (op. 13) in g-minor, G. Gershwin: Rhapsody in Blue (with LJOrchester RP Michel Luig, conductor)

== Books ==
- L`Effet Psychologique du Triton dans la Musique d`Alexandre Scriabine
- Fantasy and artistical Production, is it possible to learn Creativity?
- Solfège
