= Ernst-Wilhelm Rahe =

German politician (1958–2025)

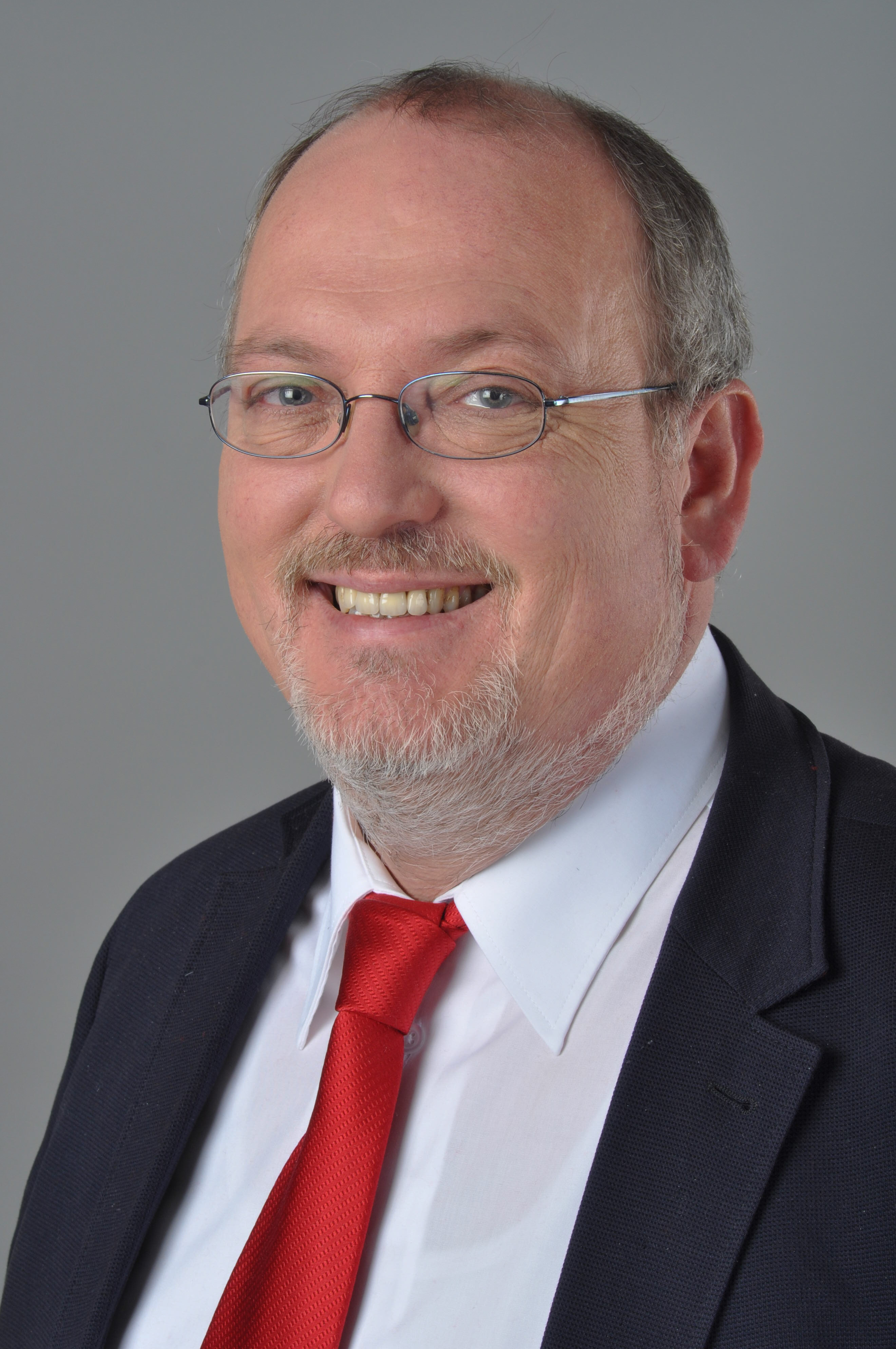
- Rahe in 2013

Member of the Landtag of North Rhine-Westphalia
- In office 10 May 2019 – 1 June 2022
- In office 31 May 2012 – 31 May 2017

Personal details
- Born: 29 December 1958 Bad Oeynhausen, North Rhine-Westphalia, West Germany
- Died: 9 November 2025 (aged 66) Lübbecke, North Rhine-Westphalia, Germany
- Political party: SPD
- Education: Bielefeld University of Applied Sciences
- Occupation: Social worker

Enst-Wilhelm Rahe (29 December 1958 – 9 November 2025) was a German politician. A member of the Social Democratic Party, he served in the Landtag of North Rhine-Westphalia from 2012 to 2017 and from 2019 to 2022.

Rahe died in Lübbecke on 9 November 2025, at the age of 66.
