= Bad Oeynhausen =

- Town
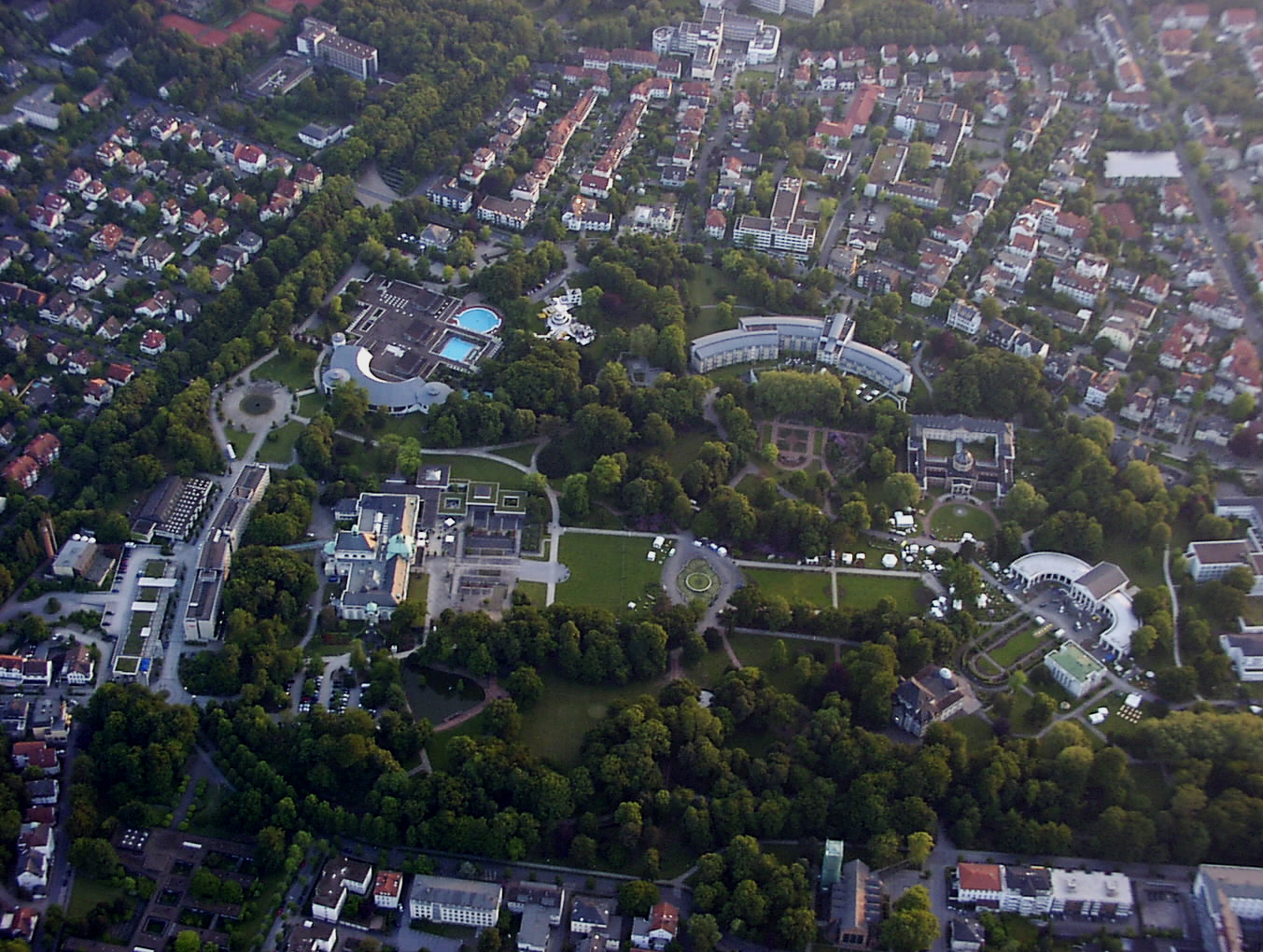
- Aerial view

- Coat of arms

- Location of Bad Oeynhausen within Minden-Lübbecke district
- Interactive map of Bad Oeynhausen
- Location within Germany Location within North Rhine-Westphalia
- Coordinates: 52°12′N 08°48′E
- Country: Germany
- State: North Rhine-Westphalia
- Admin. region: Detmold
- District: Minden-Lübbecke

Government
  - Mayor (2025–30): Lars Bökenkröger (CDU)

Area
  - Total: 64.83 km^{2} (25.03 sq mi)
- Elevation: 45–269 m (148–883 ft)

Population (2025-12-31)
  - Total: 50,515
  - Density: 779.2/km^{2} (2,018/sq mi)
- Time zone: UTC+01:00 (CET)
  - Summer (DST): UTC+02:00 (CEST)
- Postal codes: 32545, 32547, 32549
- Dialling codes: 05731, 05734
- Vehicle registration: MI
- Website: www.badoeynhausen.de

Bad Oeynhausen (German: [baːt ˈʔøːnˌhaʊ̯zn̩]) is a spa town on the southern edge of the Wiehengebirge in the district of Minden-Lübbecke in the East-Westphalia-Lippe region of North Rhine-Westphalia, Germany. The closest larger cities are Bielefeld (39 kilometres southwest) and Hanover (80 km east).

== History ==
In the village of Bergkirchen, which belongs to Bad Oeynhausen, a wellspring sanctuary existed in pre-Christian (Saxon) times at the local crossing of the Wiehengebirge, which was replaced in the 9th century by a church. Today's church is a subsequent building. On the church and the downhill-situated Widukind spring plates explain this further. A few metres from the church a 13th-century timbered homestead can still be found.

In 753 Pepin the Short, according to the Royal Frankish Annals, stopped over ad locum qui dicitur Rimiae, so that Rehme is commonly accepted as the oldest part of town.

The origin myth of Bad Oeynhausen relates that in 1745 a local farmer named Sültemeyer noticed that after his pigs had wallowed in nearby mud they had a salty crust on their backs and he decided to investigate the source. After public awareness of this finding, King Frederick II of Prussia ordered the construction of a saltworks, which was named "Royal Saline Neusalzwerk". Today's Sültemeyer Fountain (colloquial: Pig-Fountain), in the city centre, is a reminder of the city's beginning.

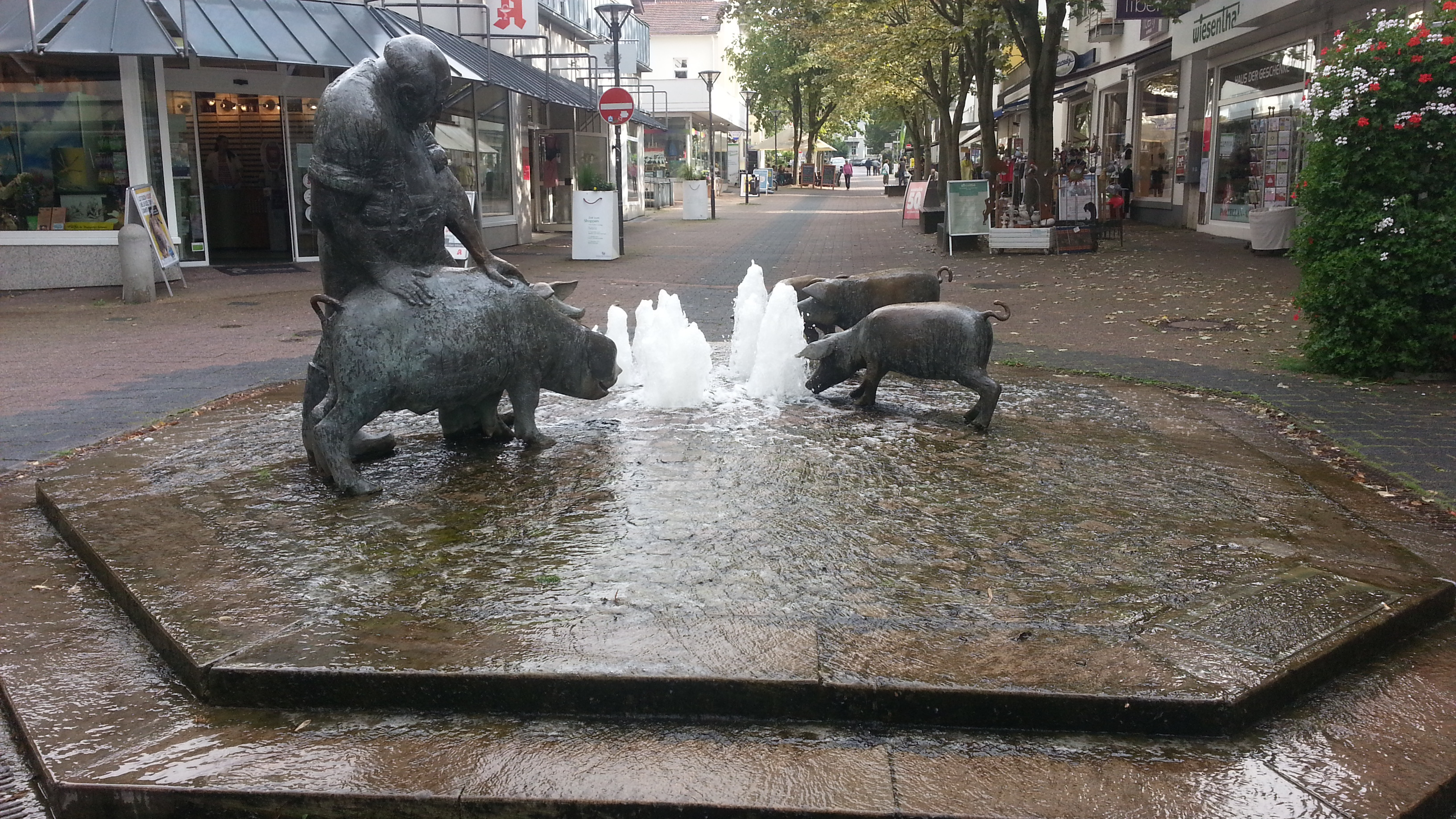
The Sültemeyer-Fountain

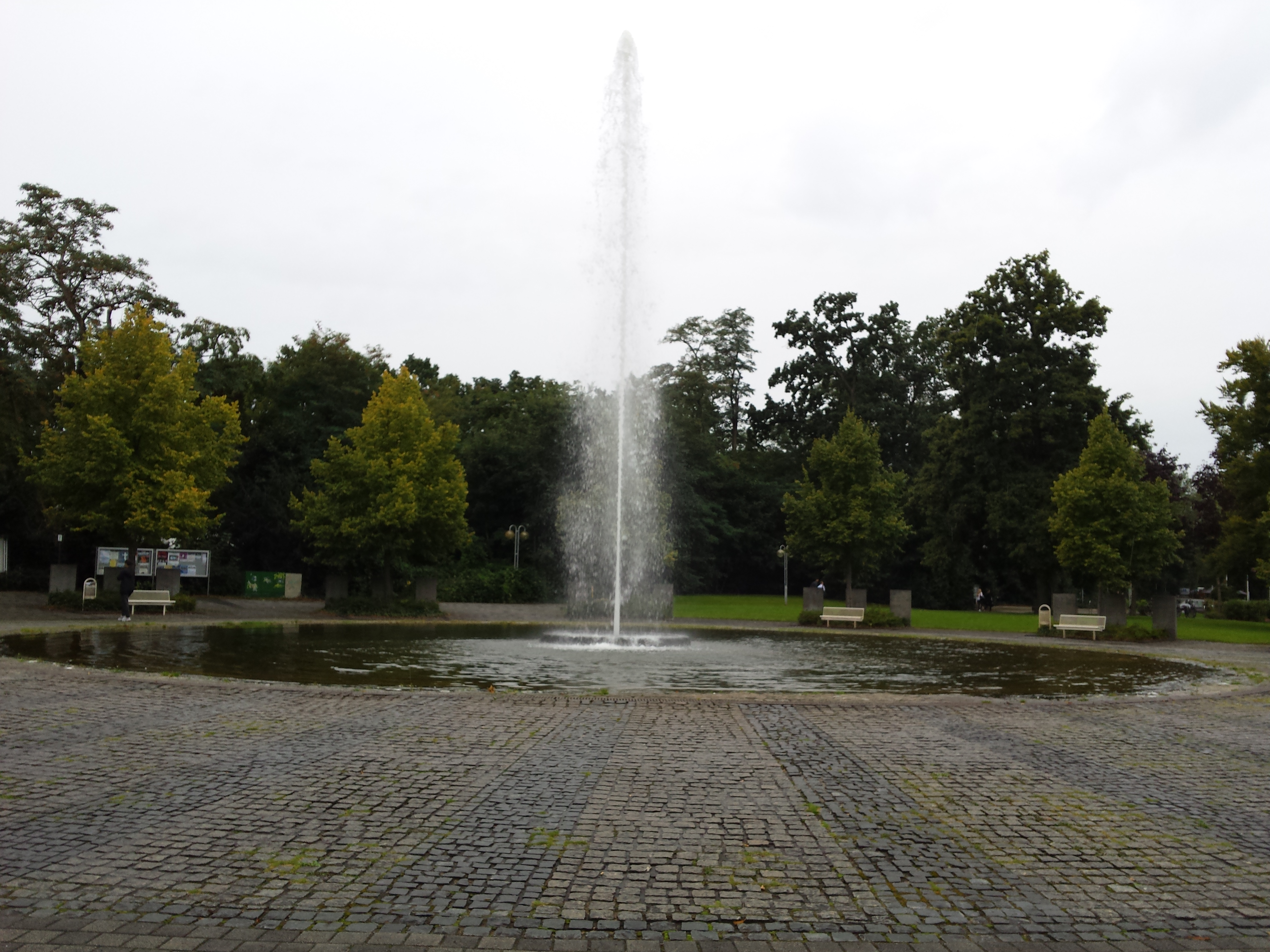
The Jordansprudel in September 2015

After 1830, mining captain Carl Baron of Oeynhausen (1795–1865) oversaw drilling in today's spa garden area in search of salt deposits, but instead found a thermal salt spring in 1845. Quickly the healing abilities of this spring were discovered and first baths were built in the community, which now was called "Neusalzwerk near Rehme". In 1848 King Frederick William IV of Prussia renamed it to "Royal Bath (German: Bad) Oeynhausen", and this name was retained after receiving its own town charter in 1860. The opening of the Cologne-Minden railway line in 1847 connected the city with railroad network.

The growth of spa activities and the town's development continued into World War II. Among other things the Kurpark (spa garden), according to plans by Peter Joseph Lenné, and the Kurhaus (spa hotel) in 1908 (from 1980 to 2002 a Casino was located here; today called the Kaiserpalais, it hosts a Varieté, a noble restaurant and a discothèque) were constructed. At the beginning of the 20th century residential houses for the bourgeoisie were built around the spa garden. The extraordinary conglomeration of different architectural styles of the spa garden's buildings and the surrounding mansions bestowed Bad Oeynhausen the unofficial title "Museum for the Architecture of the 19th Century". One of the most famous buildings, the "Farne-Villa" was replaced by a new building in 1969.

In the first half of the 20th century additional thermal salt springs were drilled. Among these the Jordansprudel, drilled in 1926, is best known and with a capacity of 6000 L/min and a total height of up to 40 m it is the world's highest carbonated thermal salt spring and de facto the town's landmark.

Under Nazi Germany, Bad Oeynhausen hosted a synod of the Confessing Church, as well as the home congregation to Jakob Emil Karl Koch, a leading member. The World War II tank factory of the town was bombed on 30 March 1945. Post-war, the town hosted the Control Commission for Germany – British Element (CCG/BE), the military government for the British Zone of Occupation and served as the British Army of the Rhine headquarters.

The town was returned to local control in 1954 and spa activities resumed. In 1973, the seven surrounding municipalities Wulferdingsen, Volmerdingsen, Werste, Eidinghaisen, Dehme, Rehme and Lohe of the former "Amt Rehme" were merged with Bad Oeynhausen into one commune. The "State-owned Spa Bad Oeynhausen" (German: Staatsbad), property of the state of North Rhine-Westphalia, was municipalised in 2004.

== Geography ==
Bad Oeynhausen is located on the left bank of the Weser river. It has the world's most highly carbonated thermal saltwater fountain, the Jordansprudel. On calm days the fountain gets up to 40 metres high. The water of the spring is believed to have many medicinal qualities, giving rise to a number of health spas.

=== Land use ===
A large percentage of the area is used for agriculture:

Area	Settlement and circulation area	Farmland	Forest	Other free area
Area in hectares	2,479	3,348	518	135
Complete percentage	38.3%	51.7%	8.0%	2.0%

This applies to the entire district of Minden-Lübbecke, where the majority of the land is used for agriculture.

Area usage of Minden-Lübbecke	All told	Farmland	Forests	Settlement and circulation area	Water area	Other land usage
Area in km^{2}	1152.22	756.7	128.98	220.13	34.08	12.33
Complete percentage	100%	65.7%	11.2%	19.1%	3%	1%

=== Districts ===
Bad Oeynhausen consists of 8 districts:

- Bad Oeynhausen
- Dehme
- Eidinghausen
- Lohe
- Rehme
- Volmerdingsen
- Werste
- Wulferdingsen

== Politics ==
The current mayor is Lars Bökenkröger of the CDU who has been serving as mayor since 2020. In the 2025 elections he was reelected with 54,7 % of the vote.

=== City Council ===
After the 2025 local elections, the Bad Lippspringe city council is composed as follows:

Party	Votes	%	+/-	Seats	+/-
Christian Democratic Union (CDU)	7,760	36.9	▲2.0	21	▲2
Social Democratic Party (SPD)	4,570	21.8	▼2.5	12	▼1
Alternative for Germany (AfD)	3,748	17.8	▲12.0	10	▲7
Alliance 90/The Greens (Grüne)	2,105	10.0	▼8.3	6	▼4
Die Linke (Linke)	974	4.6	▲1.7	3	▲1
Citizens for Bad Oeynhausen (BBO)	673	3.2	▼2.3	2	▼1
Free Democratic Party (FDP)	598	2.9	▼3.3	2	▼1
Young council members, List U-30	584	2.8	New	2	New
Valid votes	21,012	98.9			
Invalid votes	239	1.1			
Total	21,251	100.0		58	▲4
Electorate/voter turnout	39,137	54.3			
Source: City of Bad Oeynhausen

== Climate ==
The climate in Bad Oeynhausen is controlled by the Oceanic Climate. The values are based on the ones from Herford (Temperature) and the ones in Bad Oeynhausen (Precipitation)

Month	Jan	Feb	Mar	Apr	May	Jun	Jul	Aug	Sep	Okt	Nov	Dez	Year
Temperature in °C	1.3	1.9	4.7	8.4	13.0	15.9	17.4	17.1	14.0	10.2	5.4	2.5	9.4
Precipitation in mm	61.3	45.7	57.7	52.2	62.4	73.9	66.1	65.5	60.9	46.7	61.5	71.1	724.8

== Notable buildings ==
Bad Oeynhausen built a mall called the "Werre-Park". It gets its name from the nearby river Werre and was opened on 1 April 1998.

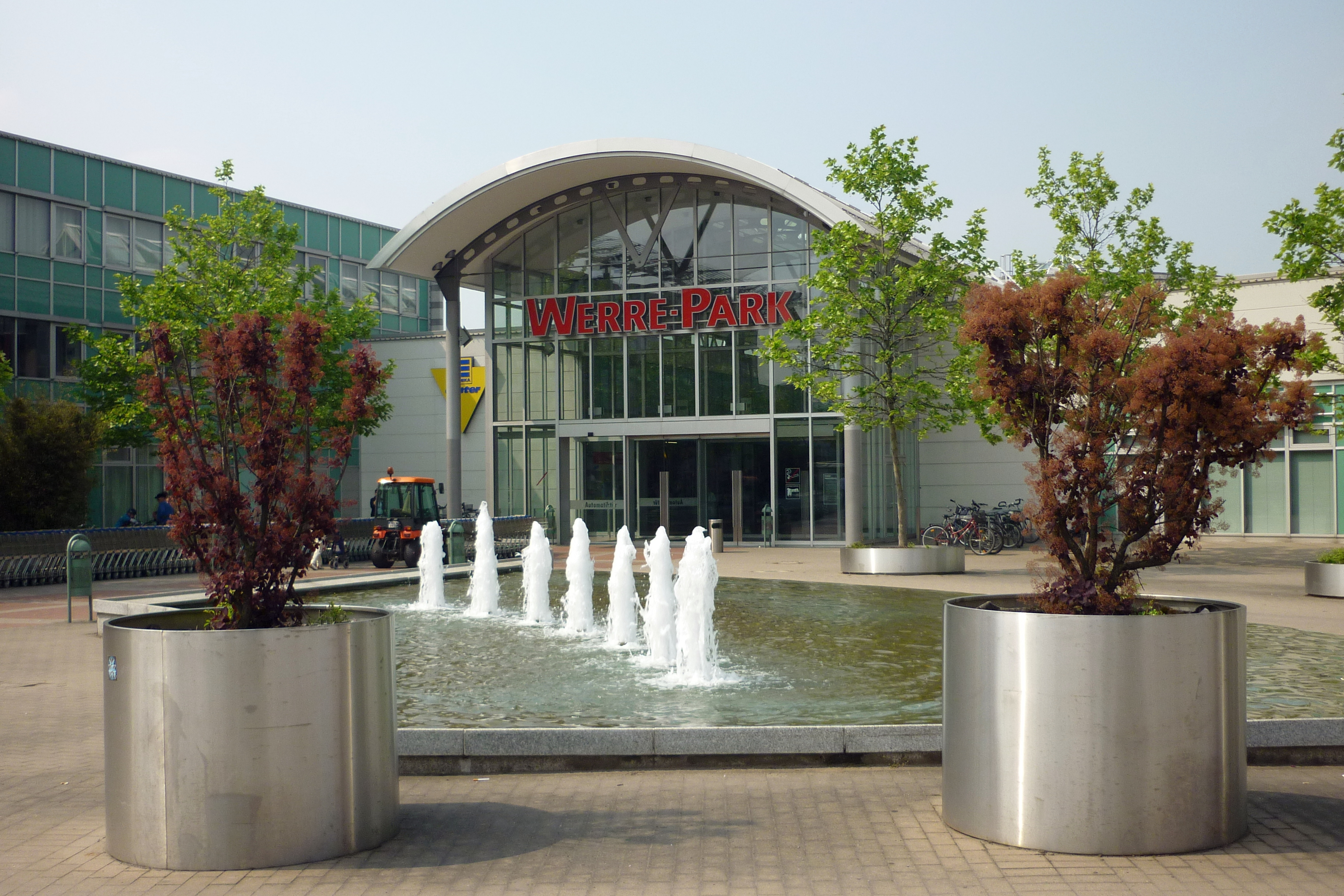
One entrance of the Werre-Park

== Population ==
Historical population

Year	Pop.	±% p.a.
1965	42,470	—
1970	43,970	+0.70%
1975	44,730	+0.34%
1980	44,336	−0.18%
1985	43,215	−0.51%
1990	46,475	+1.47%
1995	49,014	+1.07%

Year	Pop.	±% p.a.
2000	50,007	+0.40%
2005	49,221	−0.32%
2010	48,300	−0.38%
2015	48,990	+0.28%
2020	48,535	−0.19%
2025	50,515	+0.80%

Source: Landesdatabank Nordrhein-Westfalen

== Health treatment facilities ==
There are a number of health treatment facilities in Bad Oeynhausen. The Maternus Rehabilitation Clinic deals with rehabilitation for orthopedic, degenerative, and neurological conditions. The Klinik am Korso deals with eating disorders. The Median Rehabilitation Clinic specializes on rehabilitation for Muslim patients. The Heart and Diabetes Center North Rhine-Westphalia, an institution of the Ruhr University Hospitals, is a world-leading institution for the treatment of cardiac, circulatory and metabolic diseases. Just outside the city lies the Klinik Bad Oexen, a rehabilitation center for cancer patients.

== Twin towns – sister cities ==
Bad Oeynhausen is twinned with:

- Fismes, France
- Inowrocław, Poland

== Notable people ==
- August von Borries (1852–1906), railway engineer
- Wilhelm Schlüter, politician (1871–1930), (SPD)
- Fritz Tarnow (1880–1951), trade unionist and politician (SPD)
- Friedrich Altemeier (1886–1968), fighter pilot in WWI
- Walther Ludwig (1902–1981), opera singer (tenor)
- Arnold Büscher (1899–1949), commandant of the Kraków-Płaszów concentration camp
- F. Wolfgang Schnell (1913–2006), agronomist
- Siegfried Linkwitz (born 1935-2018), engineer
- Ernst-Wilhelm Rahe (1958–2025), politician
- Christian Berg (born 1966), author and composer
- Torben Giehler (born 1973), painter
- Grant Hendrik Tonne (born 1976), politician (SPD)
- Arne Friedrich (born 1979), former footballer of German national team

=== Associated with the town ===
- Peter Joseph Lenné (1789–1866), landscape architect, designed the park
- Eduard Hoffmann (1832–1894), entrepreneur
- Friedrich Christoph Pelizaeus (1851–1942), neurologist
- Karl Koch (1876–1951), Superintendent, President of the Evangelical Church of Westphalia
- Kurt Thomas (1904–1973), composer and choirmaster
- Reinhart Koselleck (1923–2006), historian
- Frank Gehry (1929–2025), architect, designed two buildings for Bad Oeynhausen
- Jochen Fahrenberg (born 1937), personality psychologist and psychophysiologist
- Ingo Petzke (born 1947), filmmaker and author
- Roland Pröll (born 1949), pianist, conductor, composer
- René Müller (born 1959), footballer
