= F. Wolfgang Schnell =

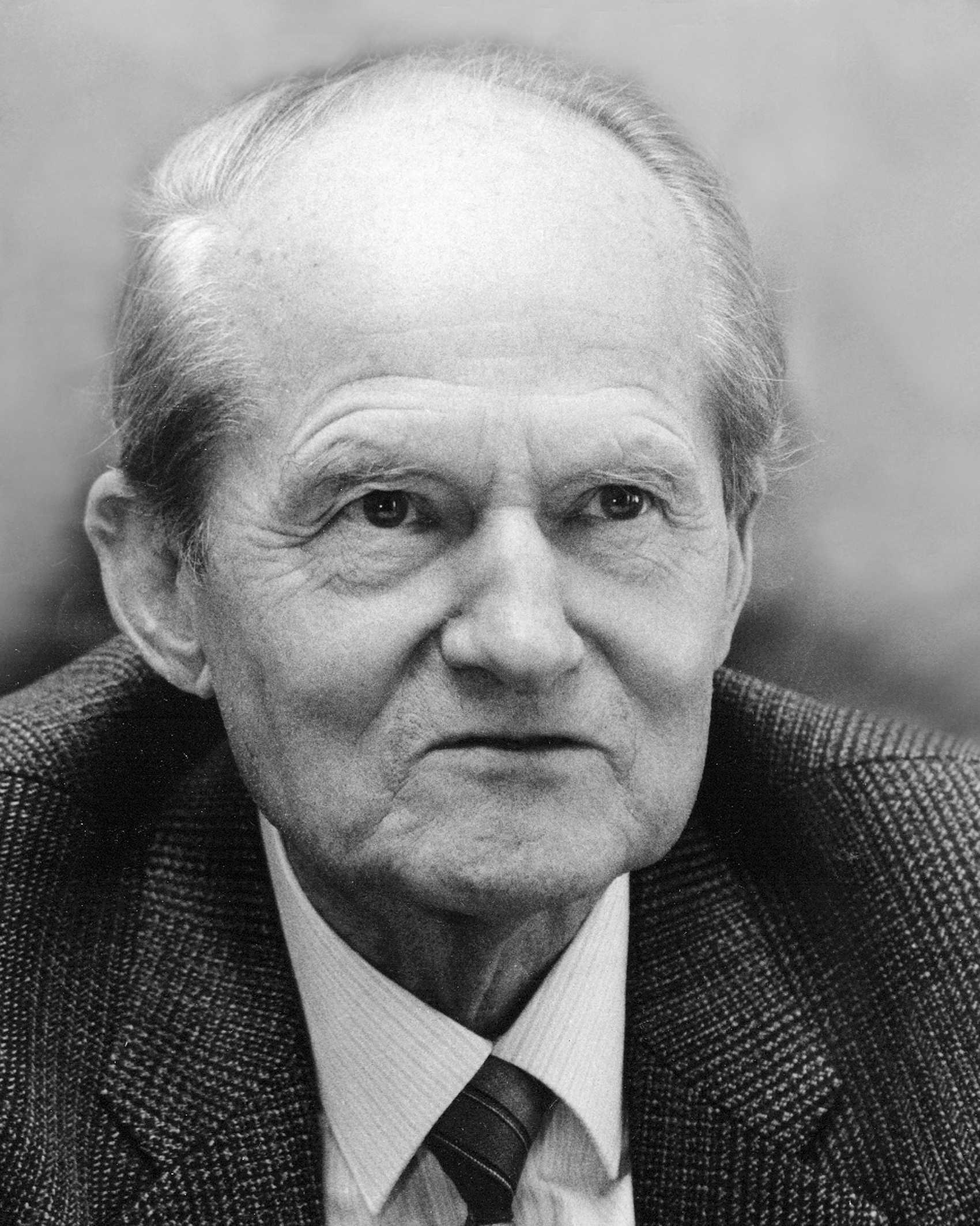
F. Wolfgang Schnell (1984)

F. Wolfgang Schnell (* 18 May 1913 in Bad Oeynhausen; † 29 December 2006 in Stuttgart) was a German professor of applied genetics and plant breeding. He belonged to the most prominent scientists in his field during the second half of the 20th century.

== Curriculum vitae ==
F. Wolfgang Schnell attended high school (Gymnasium) in Celle, Halle, and Leipzig. After having passed the final examinations (Abitur) in 1931 he served his apprenticeship in agriculture on a farm near Hamburg (1932–1934). Thereafter he studied agricultural sciences in Berlin, Munich, and Göttingen (1935–1939). Military service (1939–1945), the last part of the war as SS-Hauptsturmführer (SS-Nr. 214750, NSDAP Nr. 4139669) in the Waffen-SS, he became commander of the schwere SS-Artillerie Abteilung 503, attached to the III.(Germ.) SS-Panzer Korps. and his captivity with automatic arrest for SS-Soldiers/Officers lasted to 1948 interrupted his scientific career for almost ten years. In 1949 he received a doctoral degree in agricultural economics at the University of Göttingen. He then changed the subject and attended a two-year training course in plant breeding at the Max-Planck-Institute (MPIZ) in Voldagsen (later Cologne). In 1952 he got an appointment at an MPIZ branch station in Scharnhorst close to Hannover. There he was responsible for the cross-pollinated cereals maize (Zea mays) and rye (Secale cereale). He focussed upon the general principles of plant breeding methodology and the genetic foundations of heterosis. In 1958 he spent six months at the North Carolina State University in Raleigh (hosted by CC Cockerham, RE Comstock, and HF Robinson) and visited several other leading US universities. These visits greatly stimulated his research since he became acquainted with cutting-edge research in statistics, quantitative genetics, and breeding methodology. Five years later, he earned his Habilitation degree at the University of Göttingen, qualifying him to work as a university professor. In the same year (1963) he was appointed full professor and director of the newly established Institute of Plant Breeding at the University of Hohenheim (Stuttgart, Germany). There he headed the Chair of Applied Genetics and Plant Breeding until his retirement in 1981. During most of this time he also acted as director, later as a major scientific advisor, of the Hohenheim State Plant Breeding Institute (Landessaatzuchtanstalt).

== Research achievements ==
Already Schnell's early research at Scharnhorst received great national and international recognition. He significantly contributed to progress in the biometrical, population genetic, and quantitative genetic foundations of modern plant breeding. His greatest achievements were an extension of the linkage theory to an arbitrary number of loci and the derivation of formulae for the genetic covariance between relatives in the presence of arbitrary linkage and epistasis. The genuine impact of these two breakthroughs only became apparent about five decades later with the advent of affordable high-throughput genotyping and sequencing technologies. In addition, Schnell extended the theory of selection for quantitative traits to multiple stages and developed models for assessing the influence of epistasis on heterosis. Last but not least, he modernized the design and analysis of plant breeding field experiments by implementing new statistical tools and electronic data processing technologies.

Schnell's breeding activities were mainly directed to the two open-pollinated cereals rye and maize. In rye he started a systematic search for cytoplasmic male sterility in backcross generations of crosses between European and exotic rye accessions. This program was continued by HH Geiger and in 1984 lead to the first listed hybrid rye varieties worldwide. In maize Schnell developed early-maturing flint and dent line gene pools and in 1965 released the first German double-cross hybrid 'Velox' (FAO 210).

At the University of Hohenheim Schnell focused on the development of a comprehensive theory of plant breeding. Major research topics of his group included

- modelling epistasis in the presence of linkage,
- quantitative genetic interpretation of heterosis,
- expected response to multi-stage and multi-trait selection,
- optimal breeding plans and
- genetic correlation between testcross and per se performance of inbred lines.

All theoretical studies were accompanied by extensive field experiments, many of which were conducted in collaboration with breeding companies.

After his retirement (1981) Schnell concentrated his research on the development of a unified quantitative genetic theory of heterosis. In several papers and scientific talks he made valuable contributions to this topic. In one of his last papers (together with C.C. Cockerham, Genetics 1992) he clarified the influence of multiplicative gene action versus other types of epistasis in heterosis.

Schnell excelled in intellectual power, clear research concepts, and a strong mission towards promoting plant breeding. His creative power resulted from his enthusiasm for gaining scientific knowledge and for developing superior breeding strategies. He once compared his scientific enthusiasm with a stampeder's frenetic search for gold.

== Teaching ==
When Schnell was appointed professor of Applied Genetics and Plant Breeding at Hohenheim, no adequate course program existed in this field. During the first years of his employment he therefore spent most of his energy on developing an up-to-date teaching program covering all relevant basic and applied areas. According to his research interests he put particular emphasis on the theoretical foundations and the general principles of plant breeding. He classified the breeding methods into four breeding categories viz. line, population, hybrid, and clone breeding. These categories are unambiguously defined by the reproductive characteristics and the genetic structure of the resulting varieties as well as by the mode of reproduction of the respective species. This classification system proved highly useful not only in teaching but also in research. In the course of time the system was adopted by many colleagues in Germany and abroad.

Schnell also built up first courses in biometry and population genetics. To strengthen these subjects, the University of Hohenheim followed his proposal to install a new chair for each of these fields (1971). Thereby Hohenheim became one of the most attractive places for studying plant breeding in Germany. Furthermore, he suggested a fundamental reform of the study course in Agricultural Sciences and, together with D Fewson (animal breeding), he initiated a new study course in Agricultural Biology.

Schnell mentored 26 Ph.D. students, many of whom reached leading positions in research institutions and breeding companies.

== Awards ==
- 1978 Max-Eyth-Medal in Silver granted by the Germany Agricultural Society (DLG)
- 1980 Honorary doctor of agricultural sciences (Dr. sc. agr. h. c.) granted by the Georg- August-Universität, Göttingen
- 1981 “Goldenes Maiskorn“ Award and honorary membership granted by the German Maize Committee (DMK)
- 1992 Honorary membership granted by the German Plant Breeding Society (GPZ)
- 1997 Honorary title „Distinguished Pioneer in Heterosis“ granted by the International Center of Maize and Wheat Breeding (CIMMYT), Mexico
- 2006 Honorary patron of the newly established ”F.W. Schnell Endowed Chair of Crop Biodiversity and Breeding Informatics” granted by the KWS SEED AG to the University of Hohenheim

== Publications (selection) ==
- Schnell FW (1958) Elementarmethoden der Statistik. In: Handbuch der Pflanzenzüchtung, 2. ed, Vol I pp 732–780, Parey, Berlin and Hamburg.
- Schnell FW (1958) Vererbungsanalysen bei quantitativer Merkmalsvariation. In: Handbuch der Pflanzenzüchtung, 2. ed, Vol I pp. 815–832, Parey, Berlin and Hamburg.
- Schnell FW (1958) On plant selection in successive stages. Invited paper, Ann Meet Amer Soc Agron, see Agronomy Abstracts Vol. 50.
- Schnell FW (1961) Some general formulations of linkage effects in inbreeding. Genetics 46:947-957.
- Schnell FW (1963) The covariance between relatives in the presence of linkage. In: Hanson WD and Robinson HF (eds.) Statistical Genetics and Plant Breeding, pp 468–483. NAS-NRC 982, Washington.
- Schnell FW (1965) Die Covarianz zwischen Verwandten in einer gen-orthogonalen Population. I. Allgemeine Theorie. Biometr Z 7:1-49.
- Geiger HH, Schnell FW (1970) Cytoplasmic male sterility in rye (Secale cereale L.). Crop Sci 10:590-593.
- Schnell FW (1975) Type of variety and average performance in hybrid maize. Z Pflanzenzüchtg 74:177-188.
- Schnell FW (1978) Progress and problems in utilizing quantitative variability in plant breeding. Plant Research and Development 7:32-43.
- Schnell FW, Singh IS (1978) Epistasis in three-way crosses involving early flint and dent inbred lines of maize. Maydica 23:233-238.
- Schnell FW (1982) A synoptic study of the methods and categories of plant breeding. Z Pflanzenzüchtg 89:1-18.
- Schnell FW (1984) Modelling basic epistasis for quantitative-genetic studies. Vortr Pflanzenzüchtg 7:1-11.
- Schnell FW (1987) Quantitative genetics in crop improvement. In: Weir BS, Eisen EJ, Goodman MM, Namkoong G (eds) Proc 2nd Intern Conf Quant Genetics, Raleigh, NC, USA, pp 462–477.
- Schnell FW, Cockerham CC (1992) Multiplicative vs. arbitrary gene action in heterosis. Genetics 131:461-469.
