= Berufsgenossenschaftliches Universitätsklinikum Bergmannsheil =

- BG Kliniken

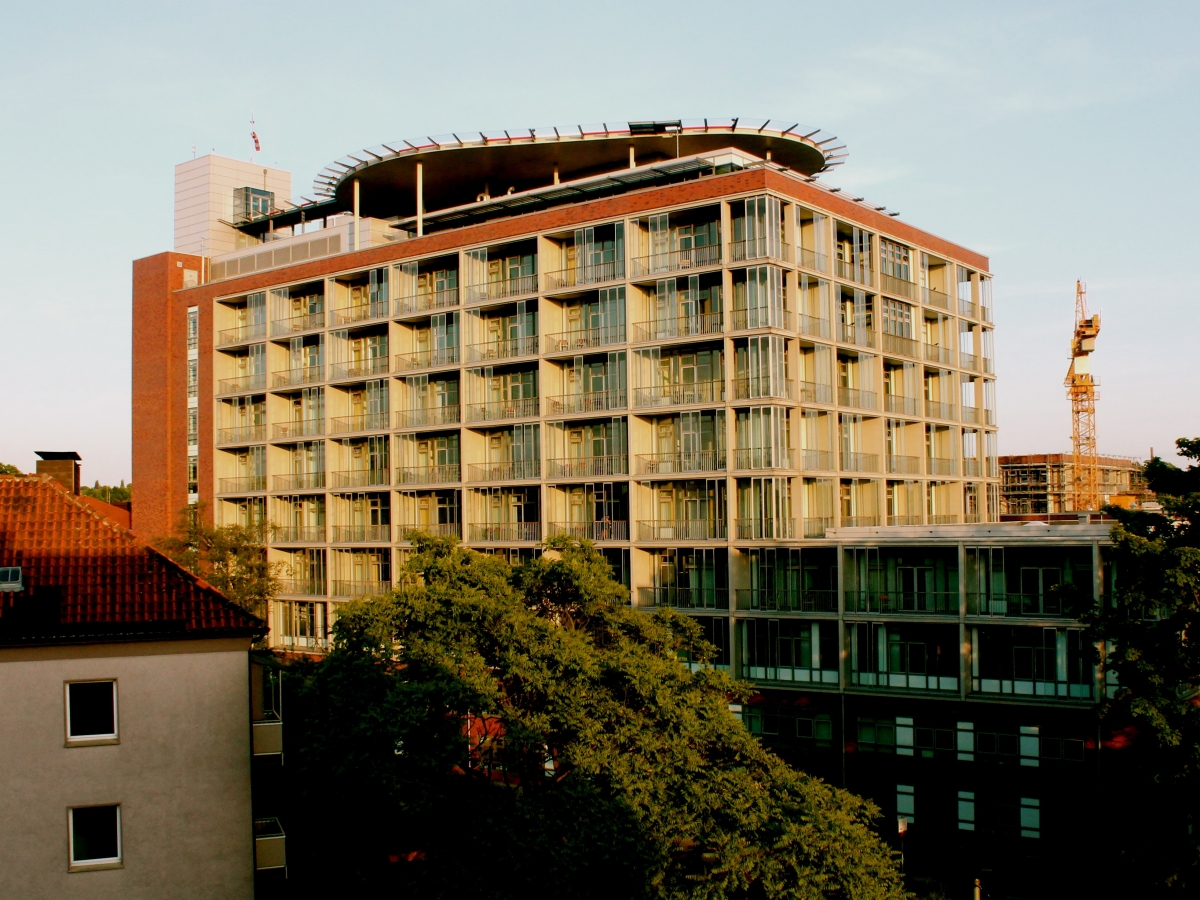
- Bergmannsheil University Hospitals (building 3)

Geography
- Location: Bochum, North Rhine-Westphalia, DE
- Coordinates: 51°28′03″N 07°12′41″E

Organisation
- Type: Teaching; Specialist
- Affiliated university: University Hospitals of the Ruhr-University of Bochum

Services
- Emergency department: Yes, Level I Trauma Center
- Beds: 707

Helipads
- Helipad: Yes

History
- Founded: 1888

Links
- Website: http://www.bergmannsheil.de/
- Other links: List of university hospitals

The Berufsgenossenschaftliches Universitätsklinikum Bergmannsheil (Bergmannsheil University Hospitals), full German name "Berufsgenossenschaftliches Universitätsklinikum Bergmannsheil GmbH", also referred to as "Bergmannsheil", formerly known as "Bergbau-Berufsgenossenschaftliche Krankenanstalten Bergmannsheil", is a tertiary teaching hospital in Bochum (NRW, Germany). It is a hospital of the Ruhr-University Bochum and part of the University Hospitals of the Ruhr-University of Bochum.

The Bergmannsheil is the world's oldest and also the largest emergency hospital.

== History ==
The first buildings of the Bergmannsheil were erected in 1888 in order to provide medical care for injured miners.

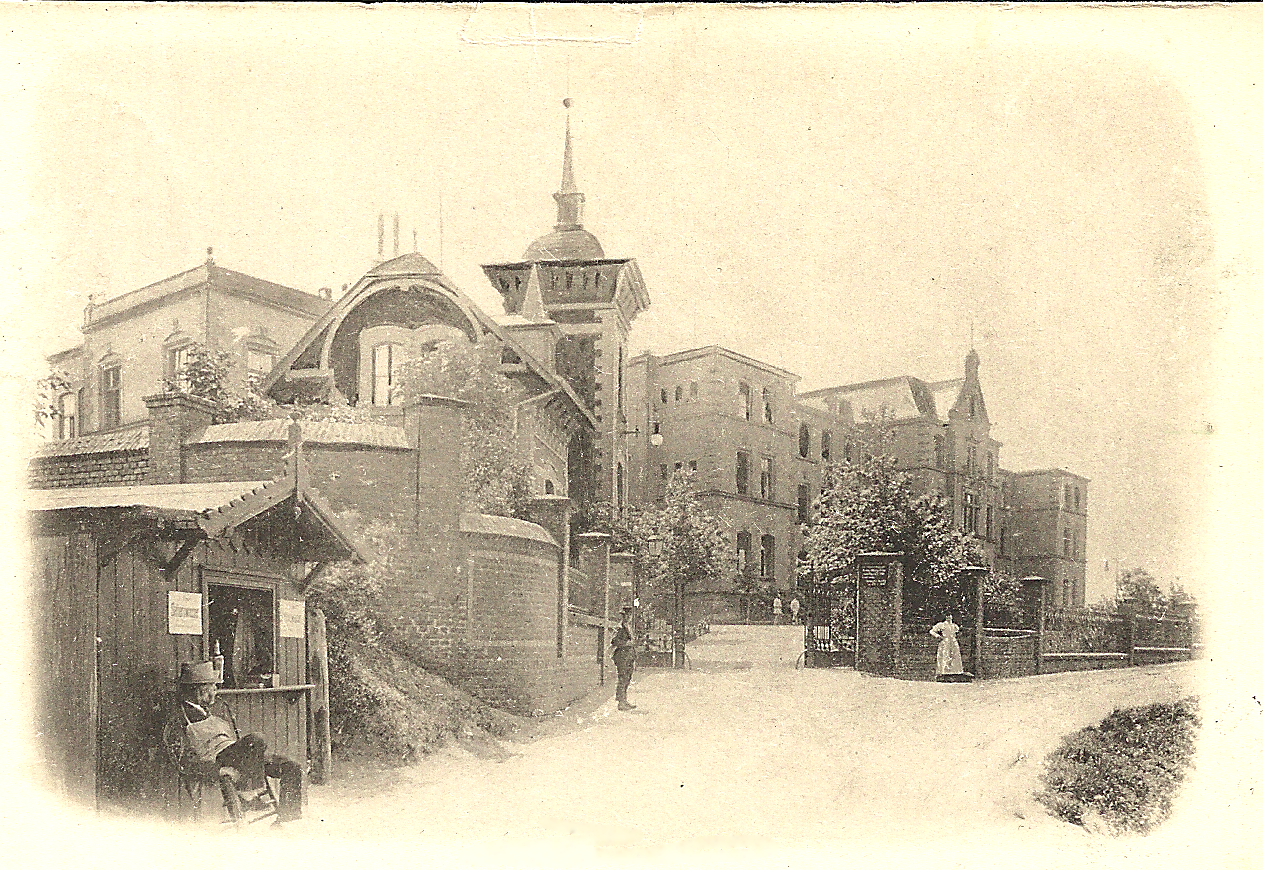
Exterior view ca. 1898

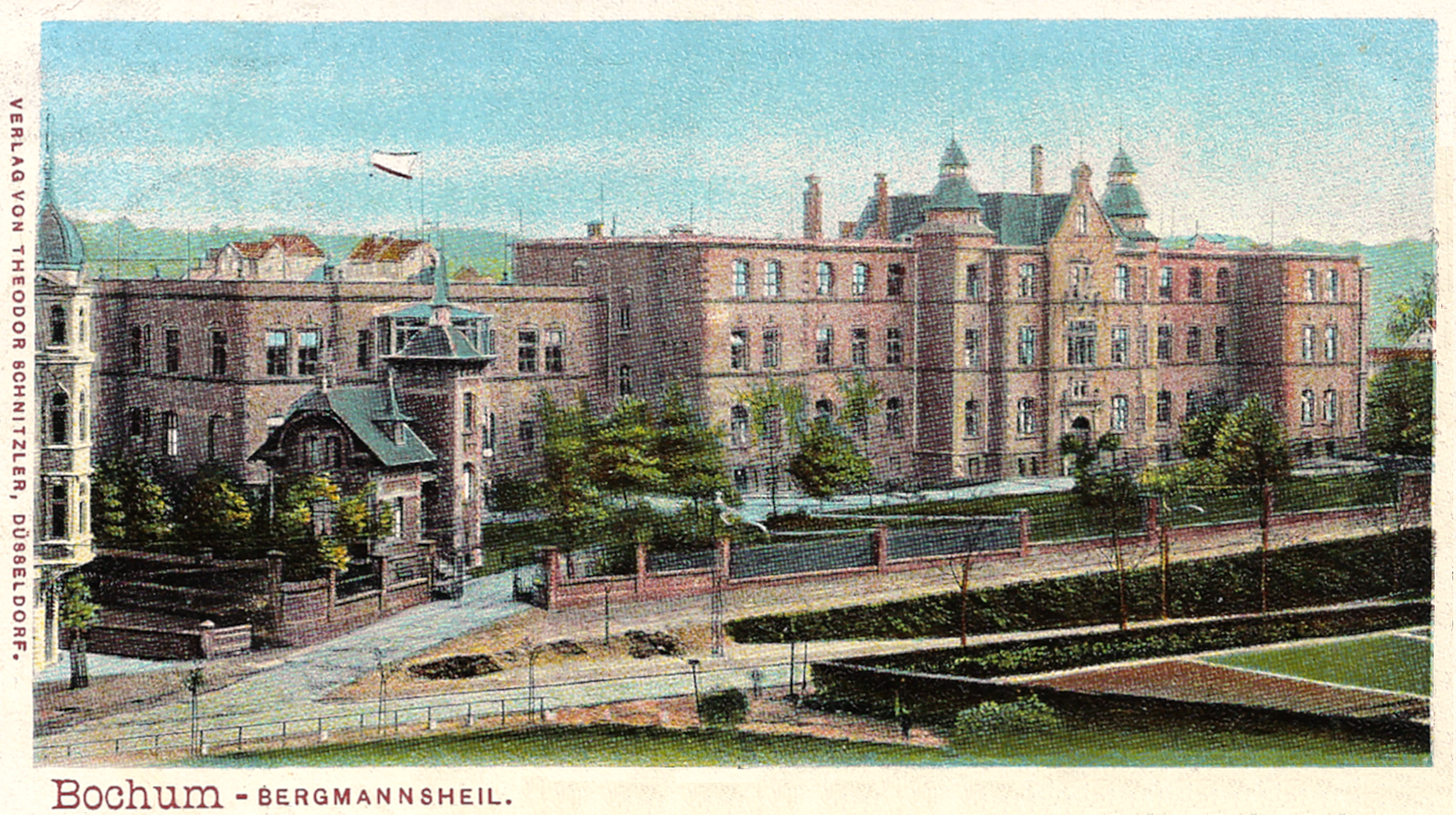
The Bergmannsheil ca. 1907

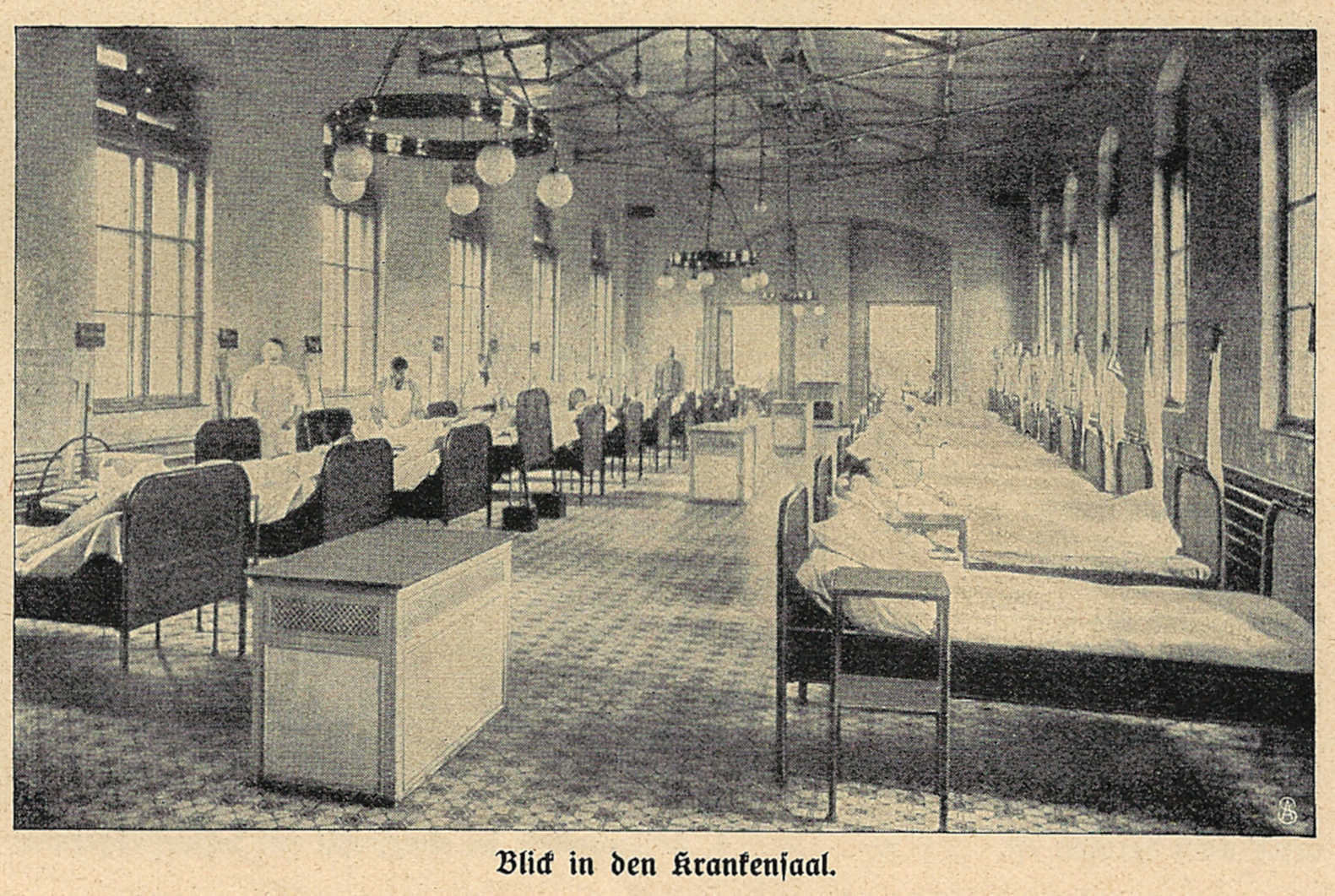
Ward ca. 1910

Over the decades additional departments and clinics were added, before the Bergmannsheil became a university hospital of the Ruhr University in 1977.

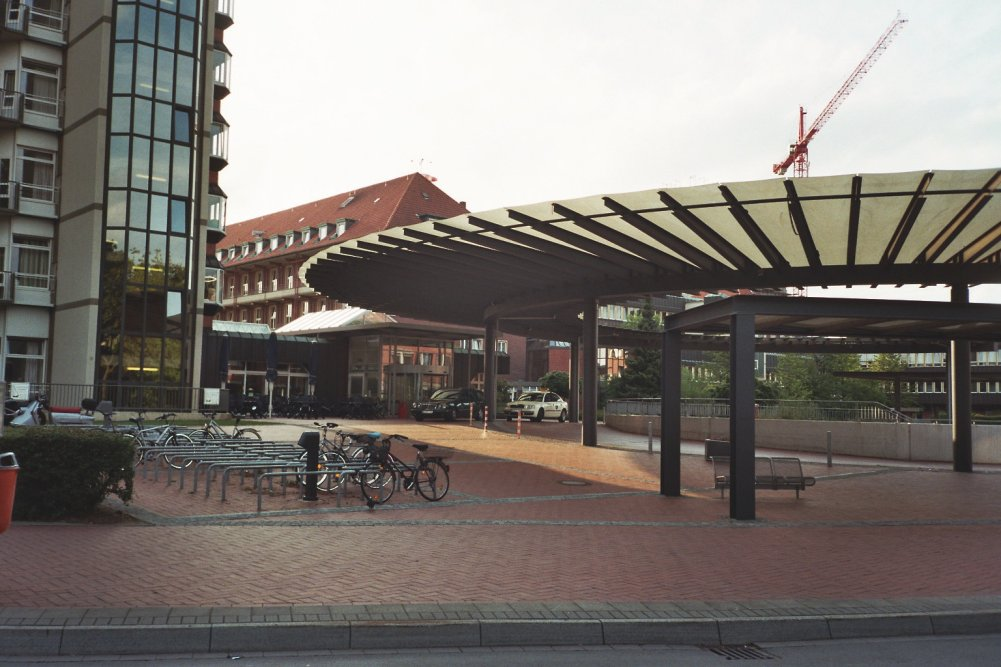
Main entry area as of 2005

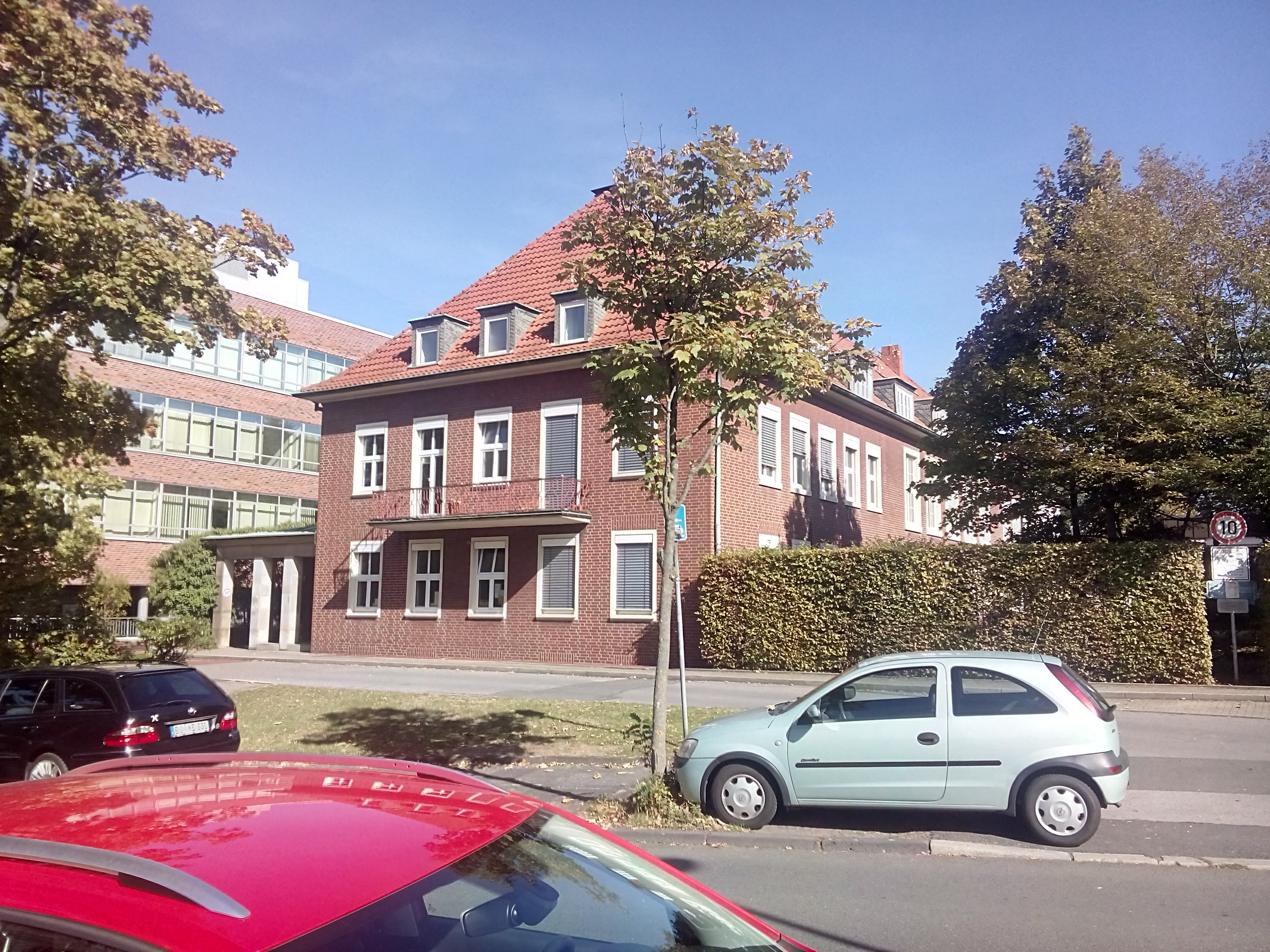
Building 8

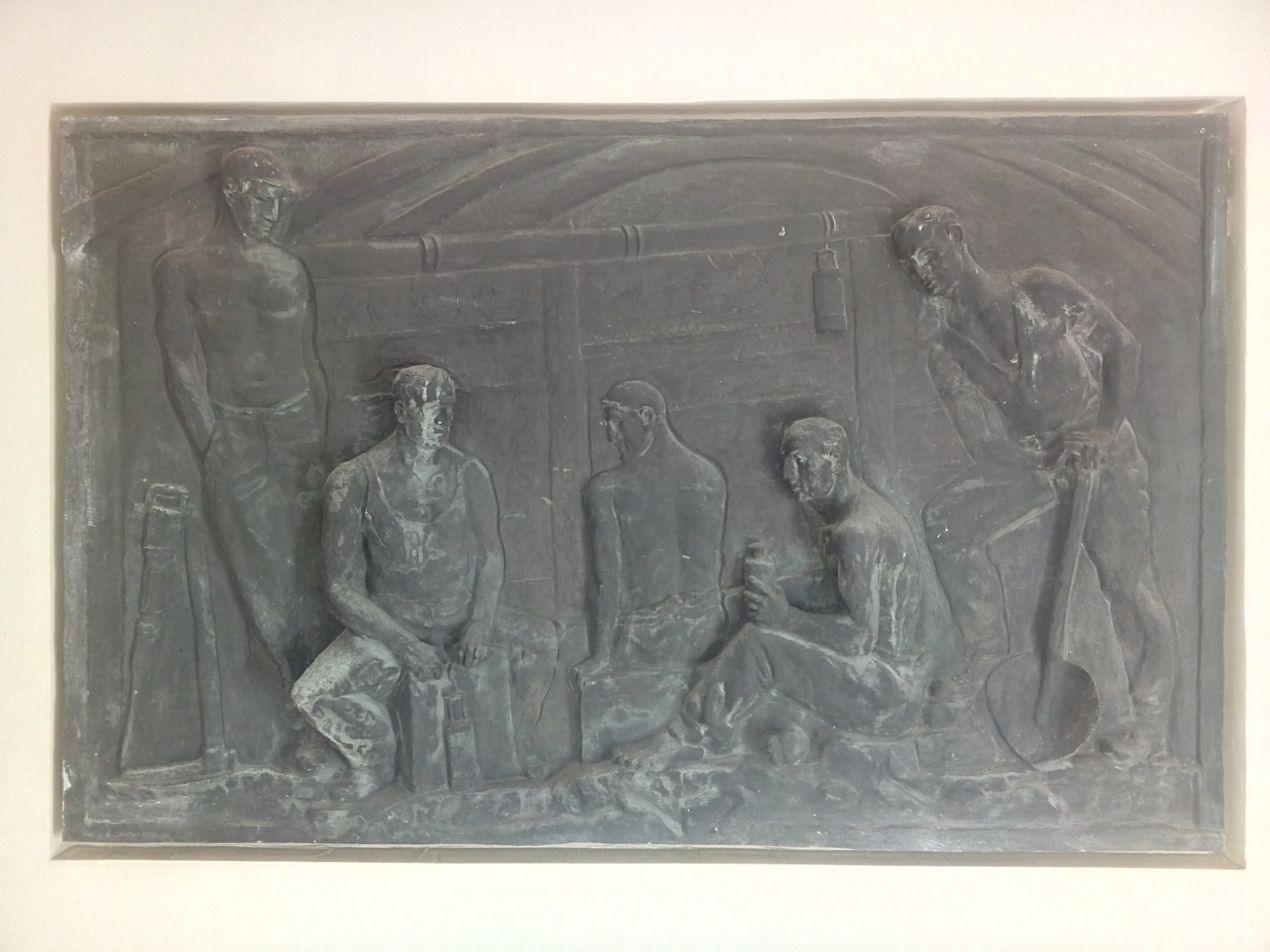
Relief in the foyer of building 8

In 2007, the Bergmannsheil was privatized in form of a GmbH.

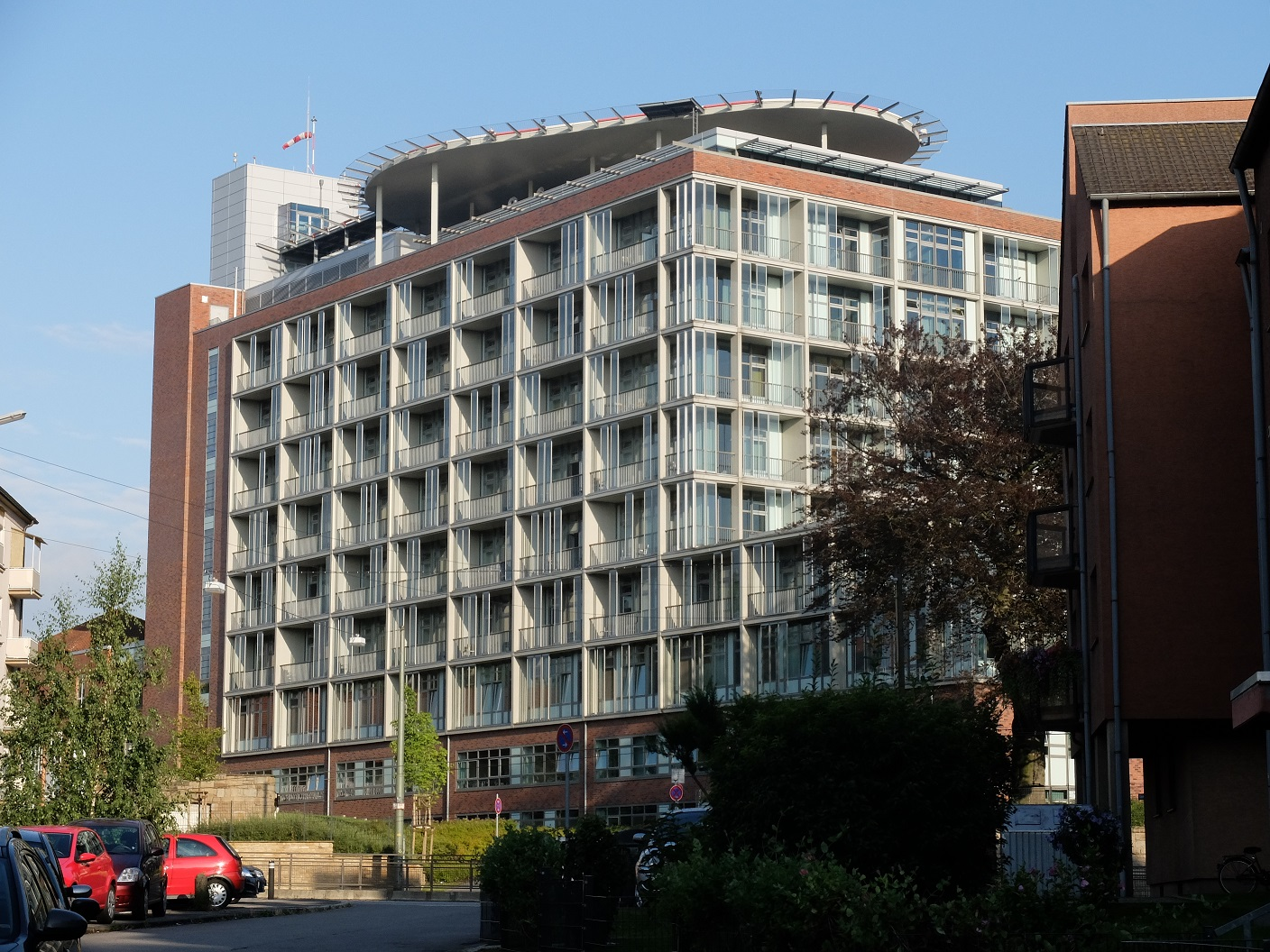
Building 3 of Bergmannsheil University Hospitals

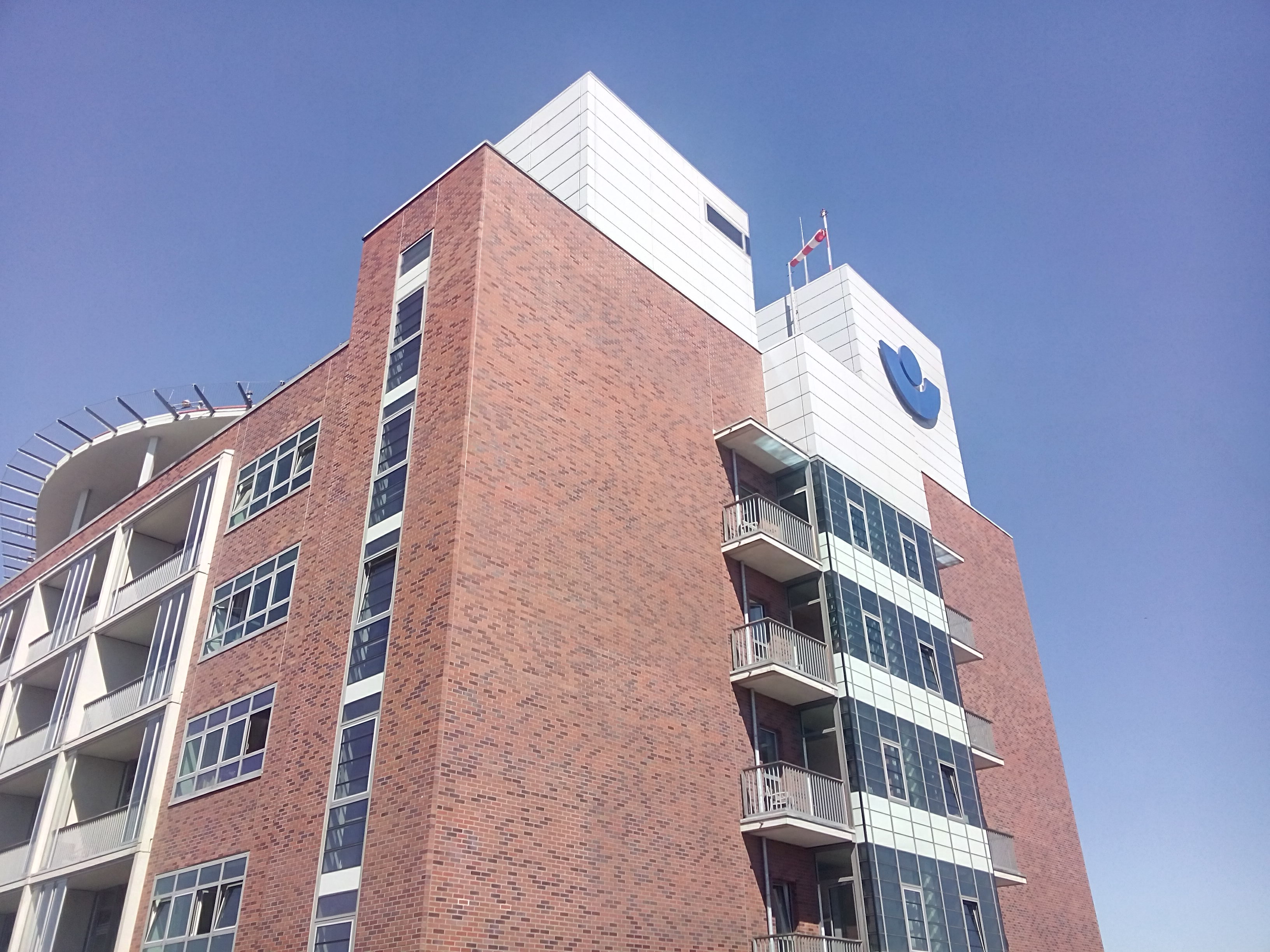
Eastern view of Building 3

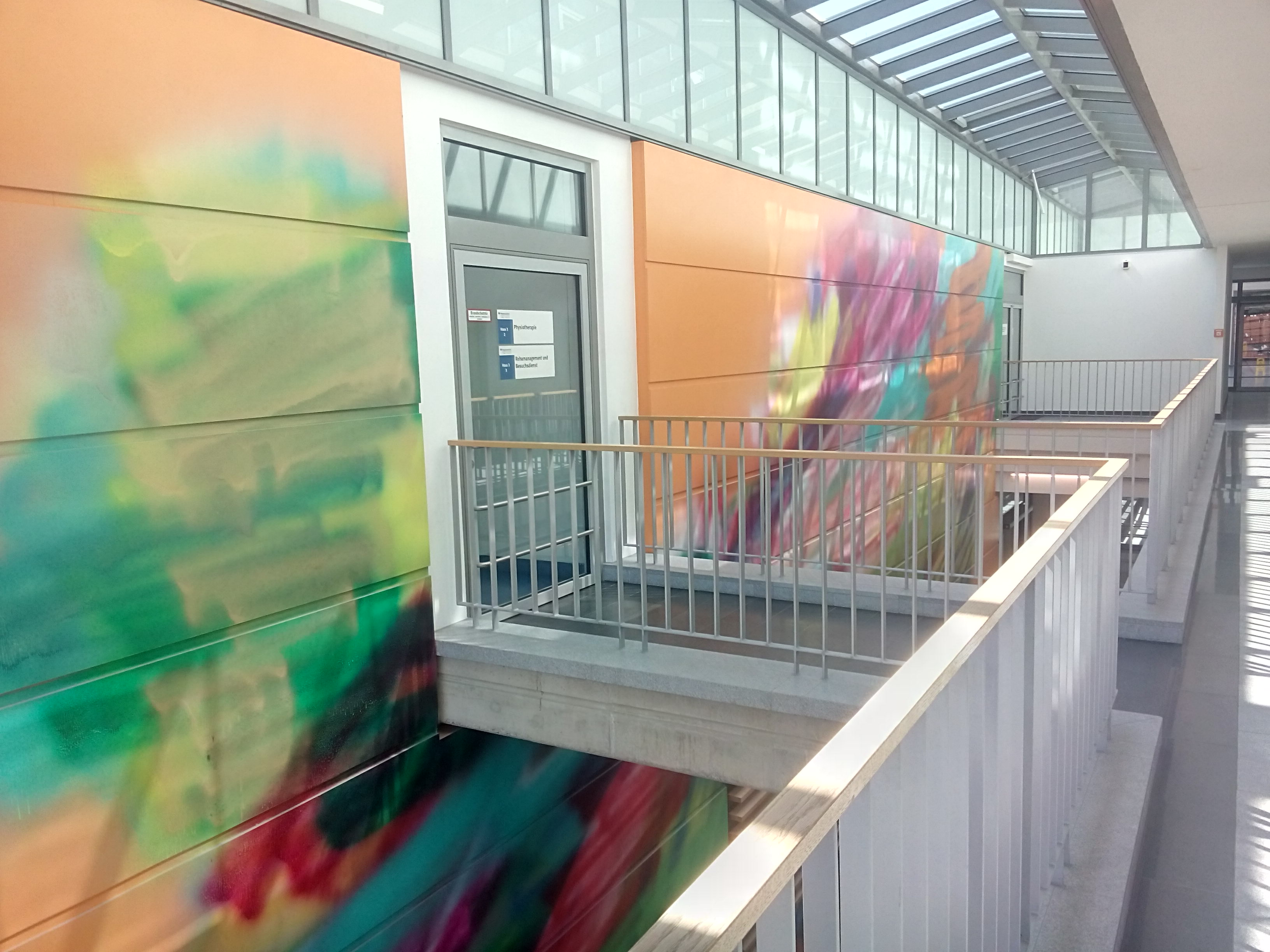
Building 3, gallery in the third floor

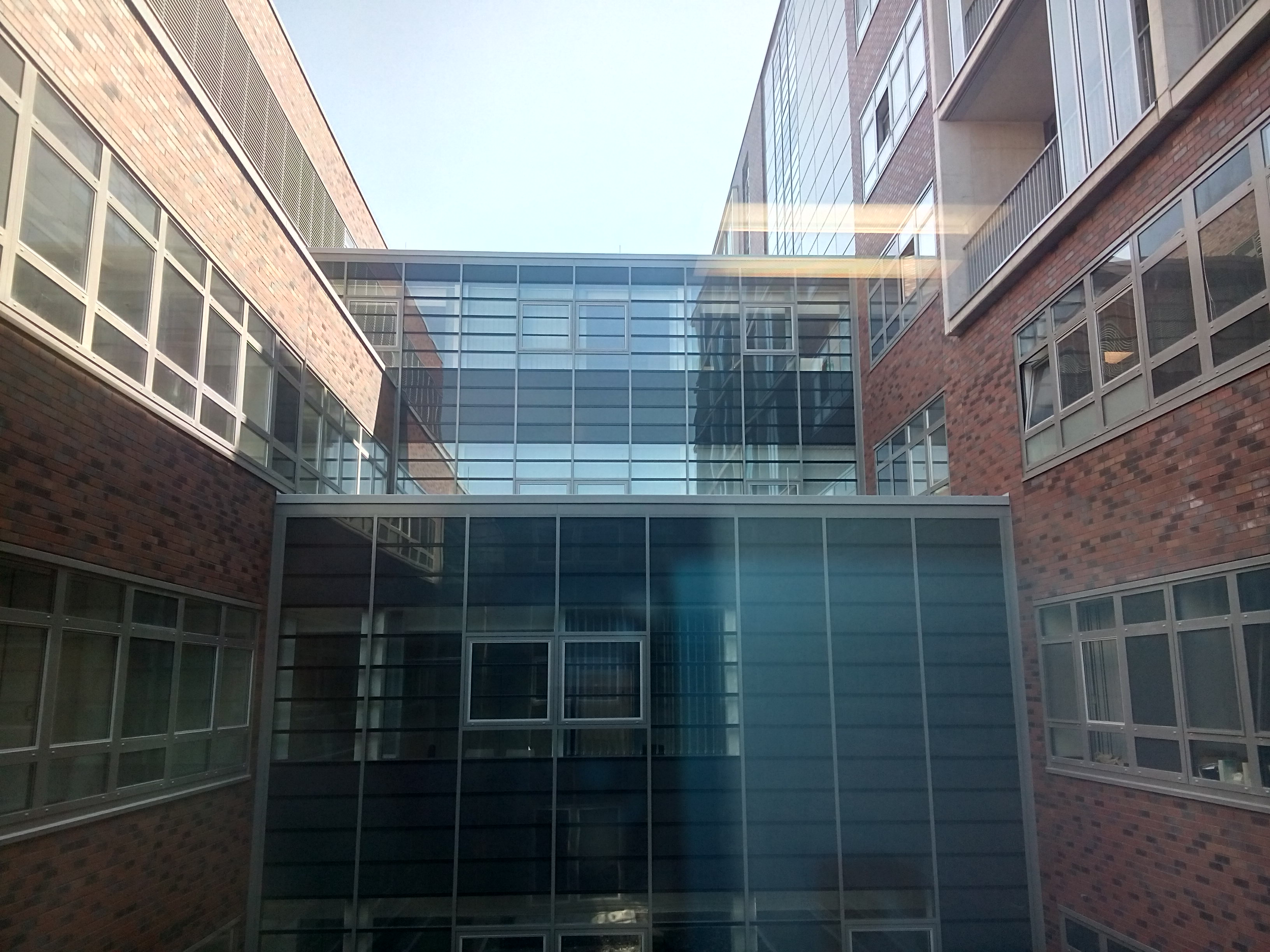
Buildings 6 and 2

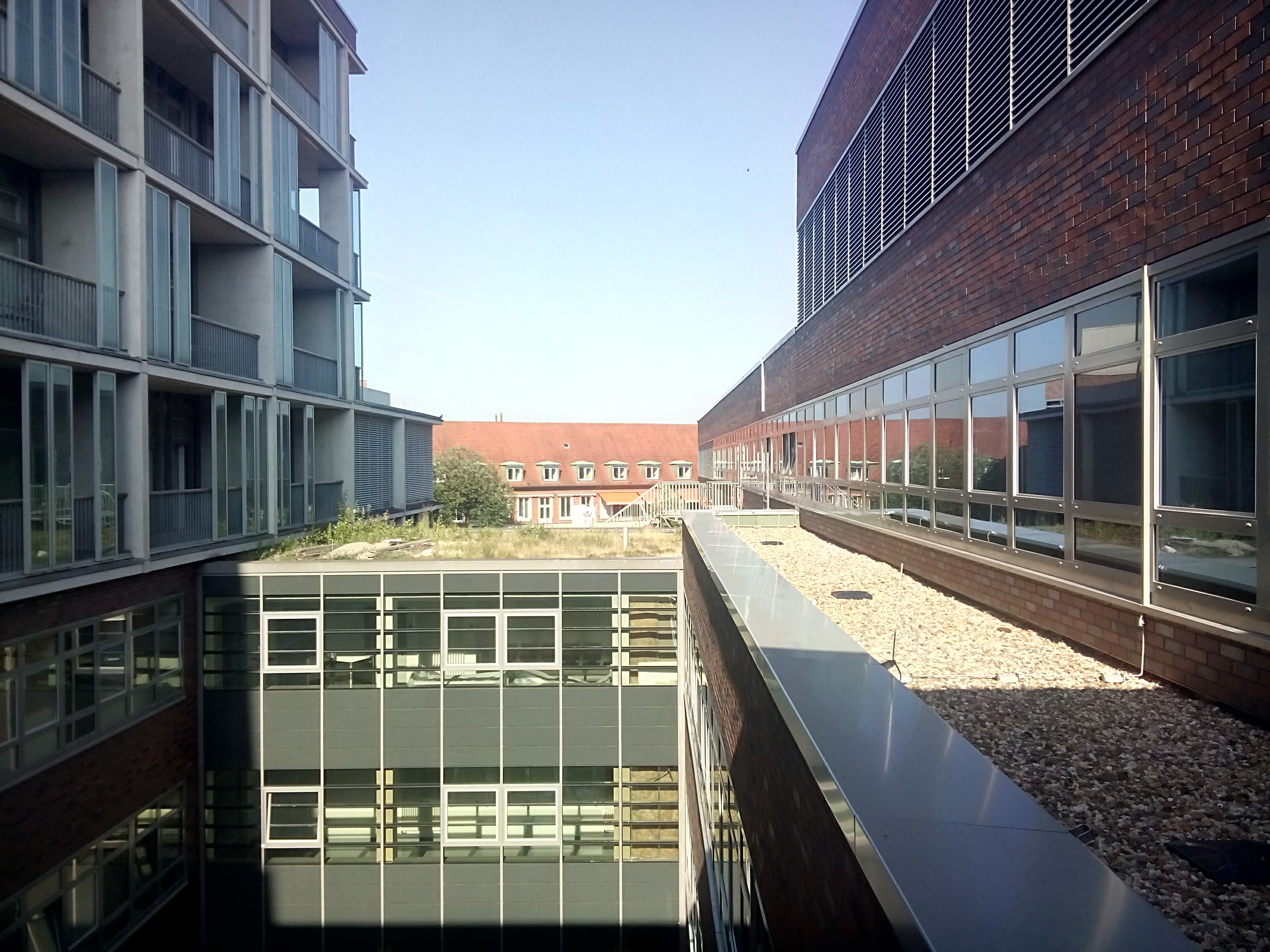
Buildings 2, 6 and 10

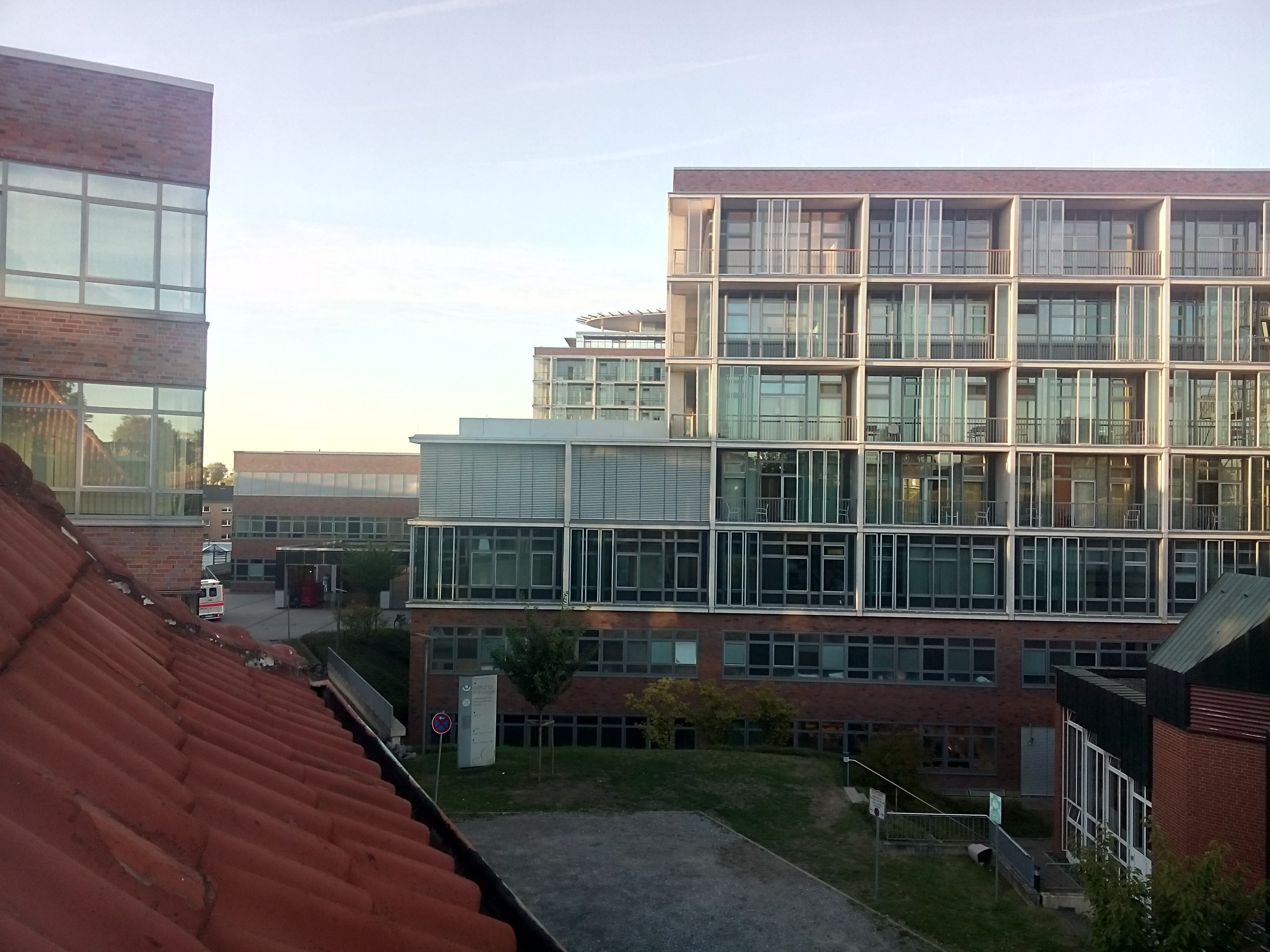
Buildings 8, 9, 2 and 3

=== Fire disaster on September 30, 2016 ===
In the night from September 29 to September 30, 2016, a fire broke out in a room on the sixth floor of building 1. The fire spread quickly over the entire ward and two adjacent storeys and continued to burn for several hours. The roof was completely destroyed by the fire. At least two persons were killed, 16 more were injured, three of which severely. The hospital declared stage 3 MCI, and subsequently several hundred staff members joined up. They were supported by 565 members of fire brigade and police from the whole Ruhr region, as well as Technisches Hilfswerk and emergency management forces of the state North Rhine-Westphalia. 126 persons could be rescued from building 1 and taken care of within the hospital. Subsequently, several functional areas and six wards with a total of 204 beds had to be put out of operation. Even after several days the fire brigades had to extinguish remaining fire pockets.

The fire resulted from arson committed by a patient, who was subsequently killed by the fire.

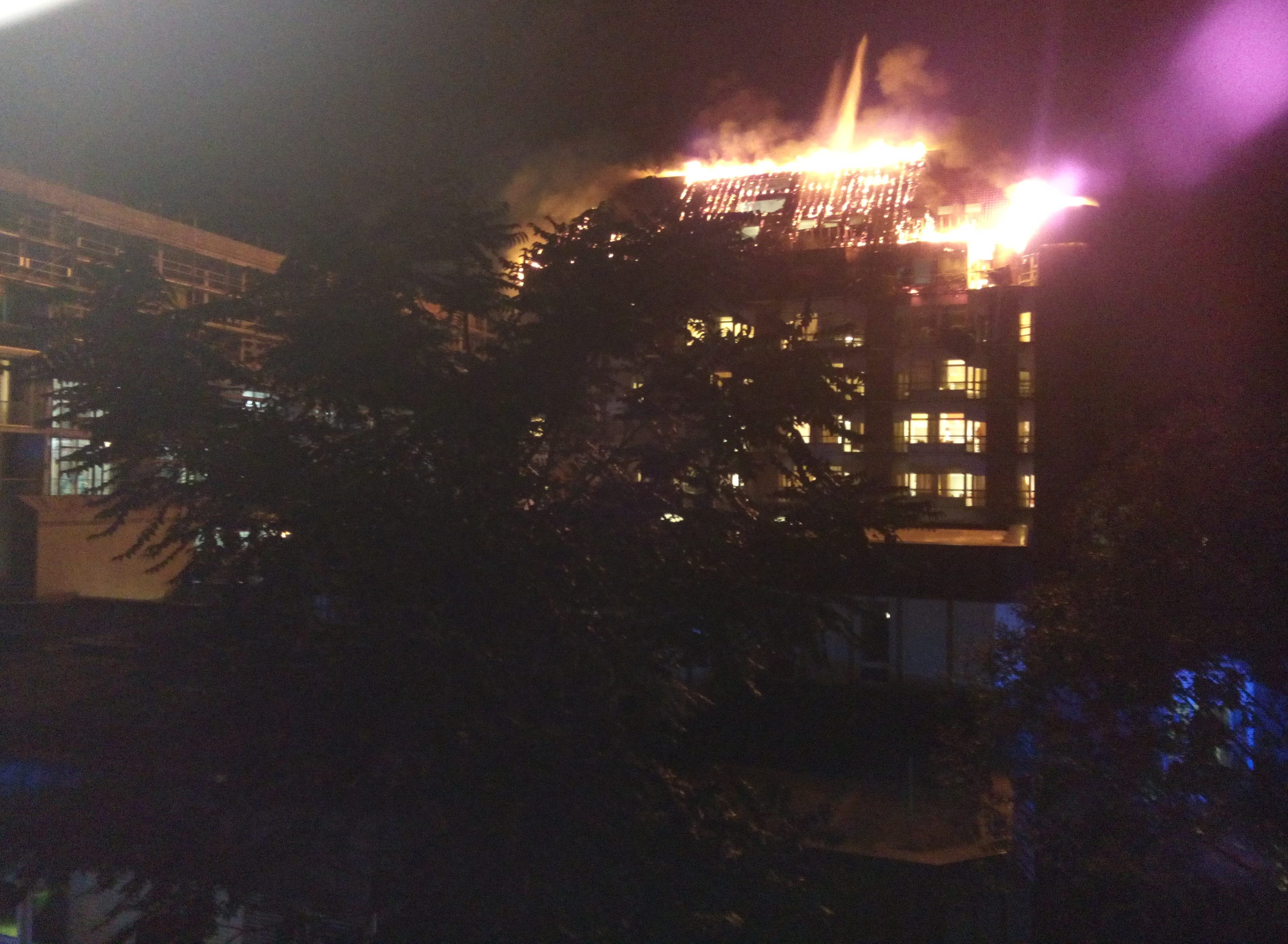
Burning building 1 on September 30, 2016

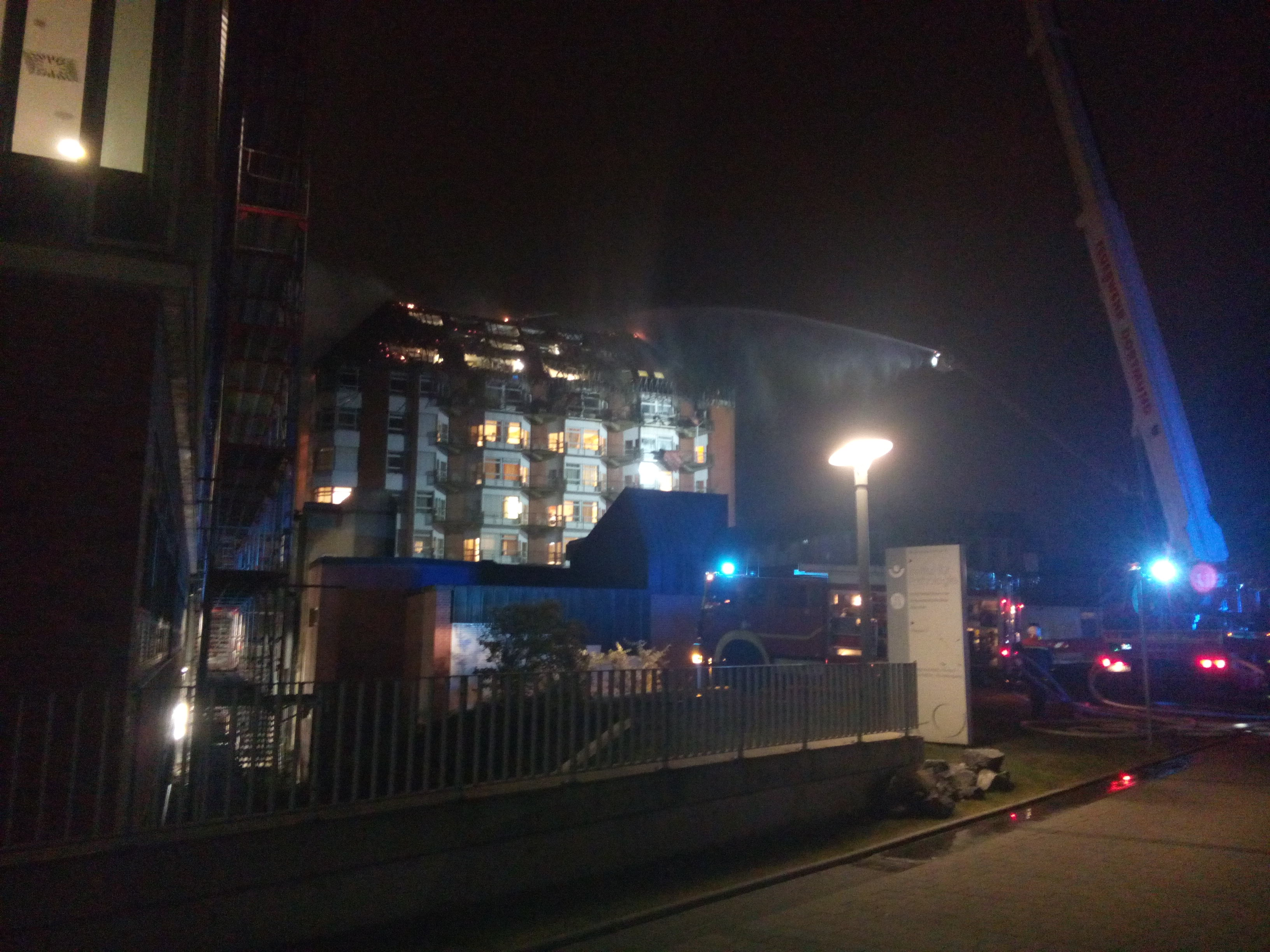
firefighting operations on the night of the fire

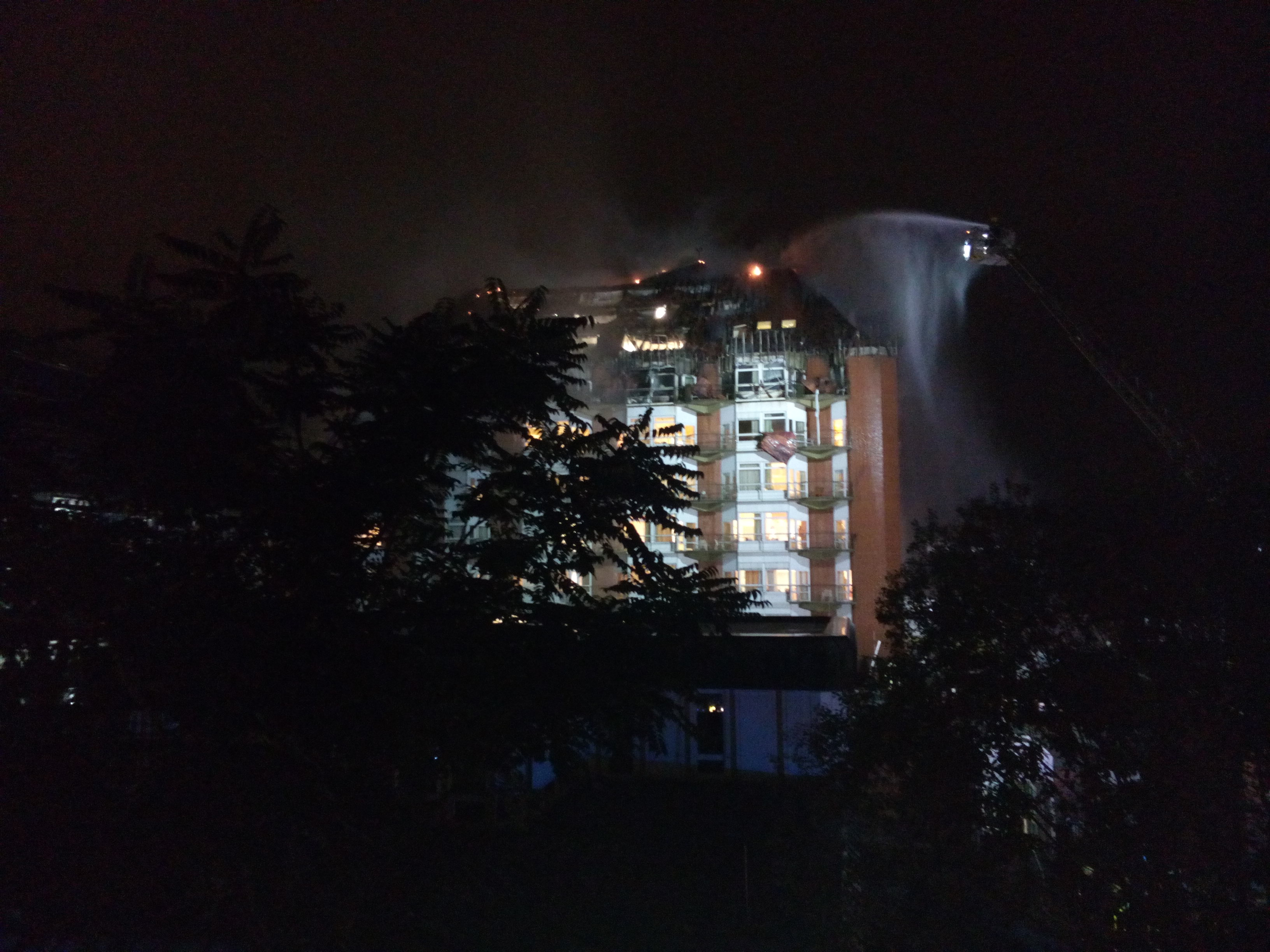
firefighting operations

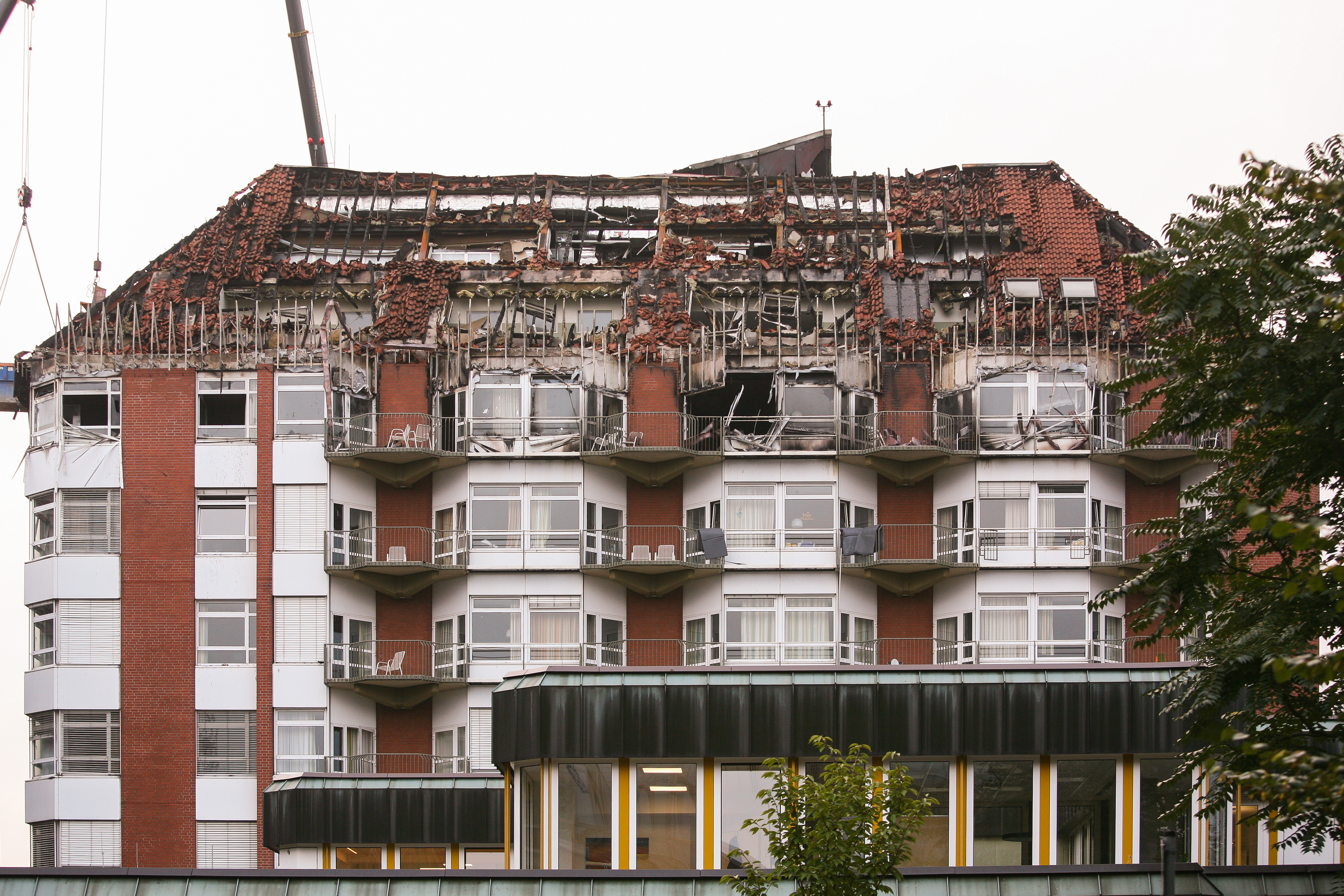
Damaged building 1 after the conflagration

== Facts and figures ==
| annual inpatients | 60,000 |
| staff | 2000 |
| clinics and institutes | 21 |

== Departments, centers and programs (overview) ==
- Surgical hospital and clinic
  - Surgical core hospital and trauma surgery
  - Visceral surgery
  - Cell biological and immunological research
  - Department for spinal cord injuries
  - Department for neurosurgery and neurotraumatology
- Hospital for plastic surgery and burn traumatology
- Hospital for cardiac and thoracic surgery
- Hospital for anaesthesia, intensive care and pain therapy
- Neurological hospital and clinic
- Center for internal medicine
  - Medical hospital I
    - Hospital for general internal medicine
    - Department for endocrinology, metabolism, diabetes and intensive care
    - Department for gastroenterology and hepatology
  - Medical hospital II (cardiology and angiology)
  - Medical hospital III (pneumology, allergology and sleep medicine)
  - Company medical office
  - Chest pain unit
- Institute for radiology, diagnostics and nuclear medicine
- Institute for clinical chemistry, transfusion and laboratory medicine
- Institute for pathology / mesothelioma register
- Rehabilitation center
- Pharmacy
- Library
- Ethics committee
- Research institute for prevention and occupational medicine (IPA)
- Hepatologic center
- Interdisciplinary departments
  - Accident and emergency unit (zNFA)
  - Hospitalisation ward
  - Intermediate care unit (IMC)
- Heart and circulation center of the Ruhr-University of Bochum
- Competence center for mental disorders after occupational injuries
- Lung center
- Muscle center Ruhrgebiet
- Disseminated sclerosis center
- Stroke unit
- Surgical reference center for limb tumors
- Center for outpatient and inpatient treatment of diabetic foot syndrome
- Bildungszentrum Bergmannsheil, a specialized institution for training and continued education of nurses
