= Heart and Diabetes Center North Rhine-Westphalia =

Herz- und Diabeteszentrum Nordrhein-Westfalen (HDZ NRW)
- Krankenhausbetriebsgesellschaft Bad Oeynhausen mbH

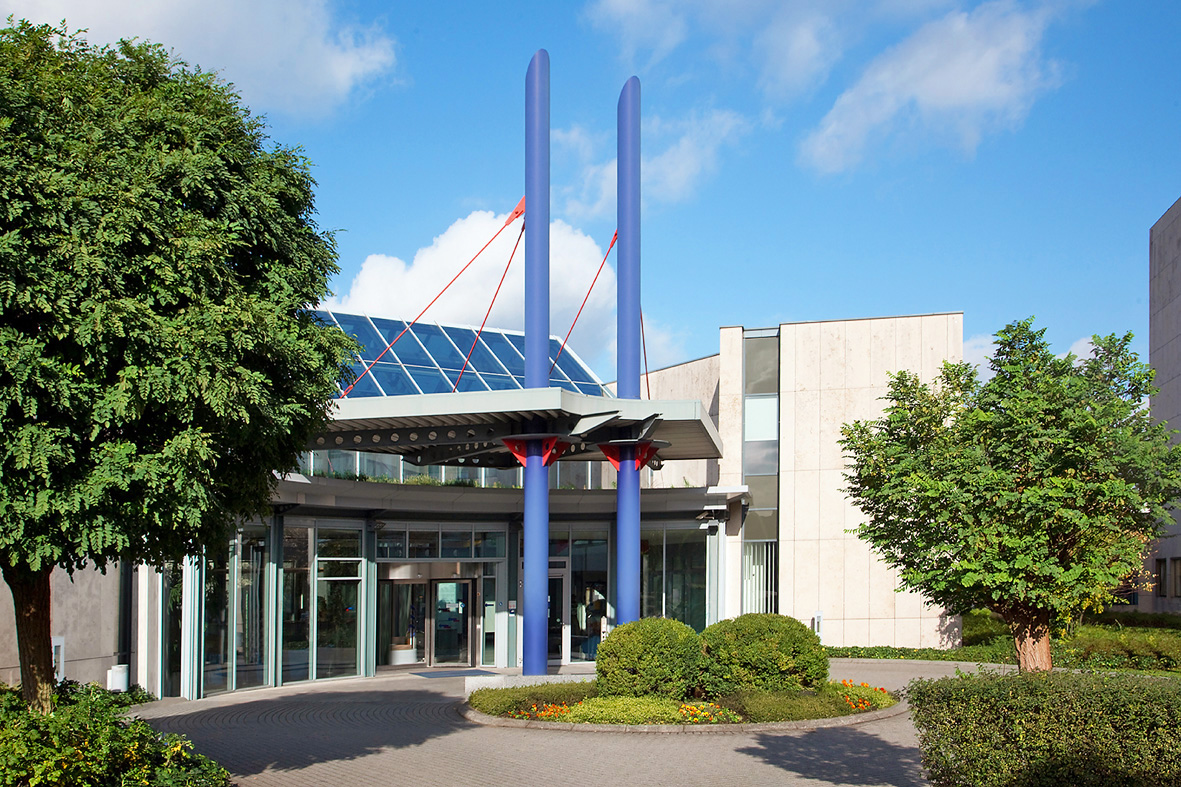
- Main entrance

- Location within North Rhine-Westphalia Location within Germany

Geography
- Location: Georgstraße 11, 32545 Bad Oeynhausen, North Rhine-Westphalia, Germany
- Coordinates: 52°11′30″N 8°47′38″E

Organisation
- Type: Specialist

Services
- Emergency department: Yes
- Beds: 500 (2010)
- Speciality: Heart and Diabetes

Helipads
- Helipad: Yes

History
- Founded: 1980

Links
- Website: www.hdz-nrw.de
- Lists: Hospitals in Germany
- Other links: www.hdz-nrw.de/en (English site)

The Herz und Diabeteszentrum (Heart and Diabetes Centre), is a heart clinic in the German town Bad Oeynhausen. It is known for performing the most heart transplants in Germany (over 2,700 since 1989).

== Cooperations ==
Besides having a lot of cooperations with the clinics and institutes of the Ruhr-Universität Bochum, it has a lot of national and international cooperations. International cooperations are:

- Hôpital de la Pitié-Salpêtrière, Paris, France
- Saitama Medical School Saitama University, Japan
- Nihon University Tokio, Japan
- University of Pécs, Hungary
- University clinic Lyon, France
- Universitätskliniken Salzburg, Austria
- Texas Heart Institute, Houston/Texas, USA
- Babeș-Bolyai University, Cluj-Napoca, Romania
- International Prevention Organization, IPO
- TEDA International Cardiovascular Hospital, Tianjin, China

== General orientation ==
The general orientation of the HDZ NRW is to improve the quality of living of cardiac and diabetes patients by a great amount. The patients get the best treatment with a low risk due to their high performance technology.
