= Torben Giehler =

German painter

Torben Giehler (born 1973) is a German abstract artist.

Giehler was born in 1973 in Bad Oeynhausen, West Germany. He is a graduate of the School of the Museum of Fine Arts, Boston. In 1999, he attended the New York Studio Program. He is the recipient of the James William Paige Fund and the Clarissa Bartlett Scholarship. In 2008, he was awarded the Falkenrot Preis from the Künstlerhaus Bethanien, Berlin

Giehler is known for his geometric abstractions. "He is fascinated by virtual spaces which, even from the outset, always illustrate realities that are just possibilities – imaginary worlds floating between planning, construction, and unconstrained fiction." (Jens Asthoff, 2008)

Giehler's work has been exhibited in the Kunstmuseum Wolfsburg and Wilhelm-Hack-Museum Ludwigshafen in Germany, the Centro de Salamanca in Spain as well as the Cleveland Museum of Art, PS 1/MOMA NY, New Orleans Museum of Art, the Carnegie Art Museum in Oxnard, CA and the Museum of Fine Arts in Boston. In 2005, Giehler was included in the Prague Biennale 2.

Giehler's work can be found in the permanent collections of the Museum of Fine Arts, Boston, MA, the Hirshhorn Museum and Sculpture Garden, Washington, D.C., the Deste Foundation Centre For Contemporary Art, Athens, Greece, the Kunstmuseum Wolfsburg, Wolfsburg, Germany, and Kunsthaus Zürich, Switzerland.

== Selected solo exhibitions ==
- 2000 Leo Koenig Inc., New York (catalogue)
- 2002 Arndt & Partner, Berlin
- 2002 Leo Koenig Inc., New York (catalogue)
- 2003 Centro de Arte de Salamanca, Spain (catalogue)
- 2003 Paolo Curti & Co., Milan
- 2004 "Sputnik Sweetheart", Arndt & Partner, Berlin
- 2004 "Jpeg Twister", Leo Koenig Inc., New York
- 2005 "Suspended Animation", Arndt & Partner, Zürich, Switzerland
- 2006 "Alphaville", Galerie Suzanne Tarasieve, Paris (catalogue)
- 2007 "Eis Hexe", Leo Koenig Inc., New York
- 2007 "Invisible Limits", Martin Geier Galerie, Algund, Italy
- 2008 Falkenroth Preis, Künstlerhaus Bethanien, Berlin (catalogue)
- 2009 "Devil in the Woods", Galerie Suzanne Tarasieve, Paris
- 2011 "Lateralus", Leo Koenig Inc., New York
- 2012 Stephane Simoens Contemporary Fine Art, Knokke, Belgium

== Selected group exhibitions ==
- 1999 Fifth Year Competition & Exhibition, School of the Museum of the Fine Arts, Boston
- 1999 Traveling Scholarship Exhibition, Museum of Fine Arts, Boston (catalogue)
- 2000 "Collector's Choice", Exit Art, New York
- 2001 "Come on Feel the Noice", Asbaek Galerie, Copenhagen
- 2002 "Building a Collection: Recent Acquisitions of Contemporary Art", Museum of Fine Arts, Boston, Massachusetts
- 2003 "Painting Pictures", curated by Gijs van Tuyl, Kunstmuseum Wolfsburg, Germany (catalogue)
- 2003 "Project 244: MetaScape", Cleveland Museum of Art, Cleveland, Ohio
- 2003 "A New Modernism for a New Millenium: Abstraction and Surrealism are reinvented in the Internet Age", The Logan Collection, Vail, Colorado (catalogue)
- 2004 "Treasure Islands", Kunstmuseum Wolfsburg, Germany
- 2004 "Surface Tension", curated by Manon Slome, Chelsea Art Museum, New York
- 2004 "Eclectic Eye: Selections from the Frederick R. Weisman Art Foundation", New Orleans Museum of Art, New Orleans, Louisiana
- 2005 "We Can Do It!", Gary Tatinsian Gallery, Moscow (catalogue)
- 2005 "Greater New York", PS1 New York (catalogue)
- 2005 Prague Biennale 2, Prague, Czech Republic (catalogue)
- 2005 "Generation X: Young Art from the Collection", Kunstmuseum Wolfsburg, Germany
- 2006 "Made in Germany", gip international fine art, Burgdorf, Switzerland
- 2006 "abstract art now – strictly geometrica", Wilhelm Hack Museum, Ludwigshafen, Germany (catalogue)
- 2006 "Negotiating Reality: Recent Works from the Logan Collection", Denver University, Denver, Colorado (catalogue)
- 2007 "Like color in pictures", Aspen Art Museum, Colorado (catalogue)
- 2007 "Grups", Hydra School Projects curated by Dimitris Antonitsis, Hydra, Greece
- 2007 "Eclectic Eye: Selections from the Frederick R. Weisman Art Foundation", Fine Art Center, Colorado Springs, Colorado
- 2008 Future Tense: Reshaping the Landscape, Neuberger Museum of Art, Purchase, NY
- 2008 Teaching An Old Dog New Tricks, Den Frie Udstillingsbygning, Copenhagen, Denmark (catalogue)
- 2008 Uncoordinated: Mapping Cartography in Contemporary Art, Contemporary Arts Center, Cincinnati, OH
- 2010 "Elements of Nature, Selections from the Frederick R. Weisman Art Foundation", Carnegie Art Museum, Oxnard, CA
- 2010 "Celebration", curated by Dimitrios Antonitsis, The Museum Alex Mylona, Macedonian MOCA, Athens, Greece
- 2010 "Changing Soil:Contemporary Landscape Painting (Za Fukei), Nagoya/Boston MFA, Nagoya, Japan (catalogue)
- 2011 "abstract confusion", B-05, Kunst- und Kulturzentrum Montabur, Germany (catalogue)
- 2011 "A Sense of Place: Landscapes from Monet to Hockney", Bellagio Gallery of Fine Arts, Las Vegas, NV
- 2011 "abstract confusion", Kunstverein Ulm, Ulm, Germany (catalogue)
- 2011 "I love ALDI", Wilhelm-Hack-Museum, Ludwigshafen, Germany (catalogue)
- 2011 "Forces of Nature: Selection from the Frederick R. Weisman Art Foundation" curated by Milam Weisman, Louisiana Art and Science Museum, Baton Rouge, Louisiana
- 2012 "Berlin.Status(1)", Künstlerhaus Bethanien, Berlin, Germany (catalogue)
- 2012 "abstract confusion", Kunsthalle Erfurt, Erfurt, Germany (catalogue)

Torben Giehler is also the founder of Peloton Cyclin Club Berlin

== See also ==
- List of German painters

== Literature ==
- Verena Ummenhofer: "Malerisch-virtuelle Geodäsie erdachter Welten", in KUNSTFORUM Band 206, 2010, S. 166
- Kerstin Kohlenberg: "Atelierbesuch: Alles in Bewegung", in DIE ZEIT, 23.10.2008 Nr. 44
- Roberta Smith: "Art in Review", in The New York Times, 4 October 2002
- David Hunt: Torben Giehler, in: Artext 78 (2002) S. 58-63.
- Leo Koenig, Inc., New York (ed.): Torben Giehler. Köln, König 2004. ISBN 3-88375-825-6
