= Bundesautobahn 33 =

Federal motorway in Germany

Coordinates: 52°07′46″N 8°10′26″E

A 33
- Bundesautobahn 33

Route information
- Length: 106 km (66 mi)

Location
- Country: Germany
- States: North Rhine-Westphalia, Lower Saxony

Highway system
- Roads in Germany; Autobahns; List; Federal; List; State; E-roads
← A 31	→ A 36

Bundesautobahn 33 (translates from German as Federal Motorway 33, short form Autobahn 33, abbreviated as BAB 33 or A 33) is an autobahn in Germany which connects the Bundesautobahn 30 in the north and the A 44 in the south.

== History ==
The history of the A 33 began in the 1960s as the B 68. It was intended that the route would be extended northwards to reach Bramsche, and to this day, the B 68 has been partially extended between Osnabrück and Bramsche in a similar fashion to an Autobahn.

One major gap currently exist in the A 33. Plans to close the 9 km long gap between the A 33 and the A 1 around Osnabrück are underway, the selected route having been submitted by the planning authority of Lower Saxony to the Federal Ministry of Transport, Building and Urban Development (BMVBS) for approval. Also a larger (about 8 km) gap existed between the exit for Borgholzhausen and Bielefeld. This gap has been closed as the last section between Borgholzhausen and Halle (Westf.) has been completed in November 2019.

== Route ==
The A 33 begins to the east of Osnabrück in Belm, crossing over the A 30 to Osnabrück Süd, running through Georgsmarienhütte, Hilter am Teutoburger Wald, Bad Rothenfelde and Dissen am Teutoburger Wald, Borgholzhausen, Halle (Westf.), running through Bielefeld, Sennestadt, Schloß Holte-Stukenbrock, Paderborn and Borchen before terminating at the Bad Wünnenberg interchange, which joins the A 44 running between Dortmund and Kassel as well as the B 480, which leads on through Brilon in the Sauerland region.

== Route names ==
The three different stretches of road are named according to the region in which they are located. The Osnabrück-Bielefeld route is known as the Teutoburger-Wald-Autobahn, the route between Bielefeld and Paderborn, which feeds into the A 2, is known as the Senneautobahn, and the remainder leading through East Westphalia is known as the Ostwestfalenmagistrale.

== Notable features ==
Between junctions Dissen and Dissen Süd, a tunnel has been built of around 700 m length to protect the surrounding area, especially the health resort Bad Rothenfelde from the noise.

== Exit list ==
Intersection		3-way interchange Wallenhorst (planned) A 1 E37
		Belm-Iker (planned)
		Belm (planned) B 51
	(6)	Osnabrück-Widukindland B 51 B 65
	(7)	Osnabrück-Lüstringen
		Hochstraße Schinkel 180 m
		Hase
	(8)	Osnabrück-Fledder
	(9)	Osnabrück-Süd 4-way interchange A 30 E30
	(10)	Harderberg B 68
	(11)	Borgloh/Kloster Oesede
		Rest area Teutoburger Wald
	(12)	Hilter a.T.W.
		Grünbrücke 20 m
	(13)	Dissen/Bad Rothenfelde
		Tunnel Lärmschutztunnel 700 m
	(14)	Dissen-Süd
	(15)	Borgholzhausen B 476
		Grünbrücke 40 m
		Grünbrücke 40 m
		Grünbrücke 20 m
		Grünbrücke 50 m
		Grünbrücke 20 m
		Grünbrücke 40 m
	(16)	Halle
	(17)	Halle-Künsebeck
		Foddenbachbrücke 56 m
		Jückemühlenbachbrücke 65 m
		Pulverbachbrücke 61 m
	(18)	Steinhagen
		Lutterbrücke 100 m
Intersection	(19)	Bielefeld-Zentrum 3-way interchange B 61
		Grünbrücke 30 m
	(20)	Bielefeld-Senne
	(21)	Bielefeld 4-way interchange A 2 E34
	(22)	Schloß Holte-Stukenbrock
	(23)	Stukenbrock-Senne
		Rest area Hövelsenne
		Rest area Hövelsenne (planned)
	(24)	Paderborn-Sennelager
		Rest area Lippesee
		Lippebrücke 110 m
	(25)	Paderborn-Schloß Neuhaus B 64
	(26)	Paderborn-Elsen B 1
Kreuz	(27)	Paderborn-Zentrum interchange B 1 B 64
		Talbrücke Barkhausen 290 m
	(28)	Paderborn-Mönkeloh
		Talbrücke Lohme-Alme 750 m
		Talbrücke Alme 370 m
	(29)	Borchen
		Rest area Letzter Heller
	(30)	Etteln
	(31)	Wünnenberen-Haaren 4-way interchange A 44 E331
End of the motorway		End of the motorway
B 480
