= Hilter station =

Railway station in Hilter, Germany

Hilter
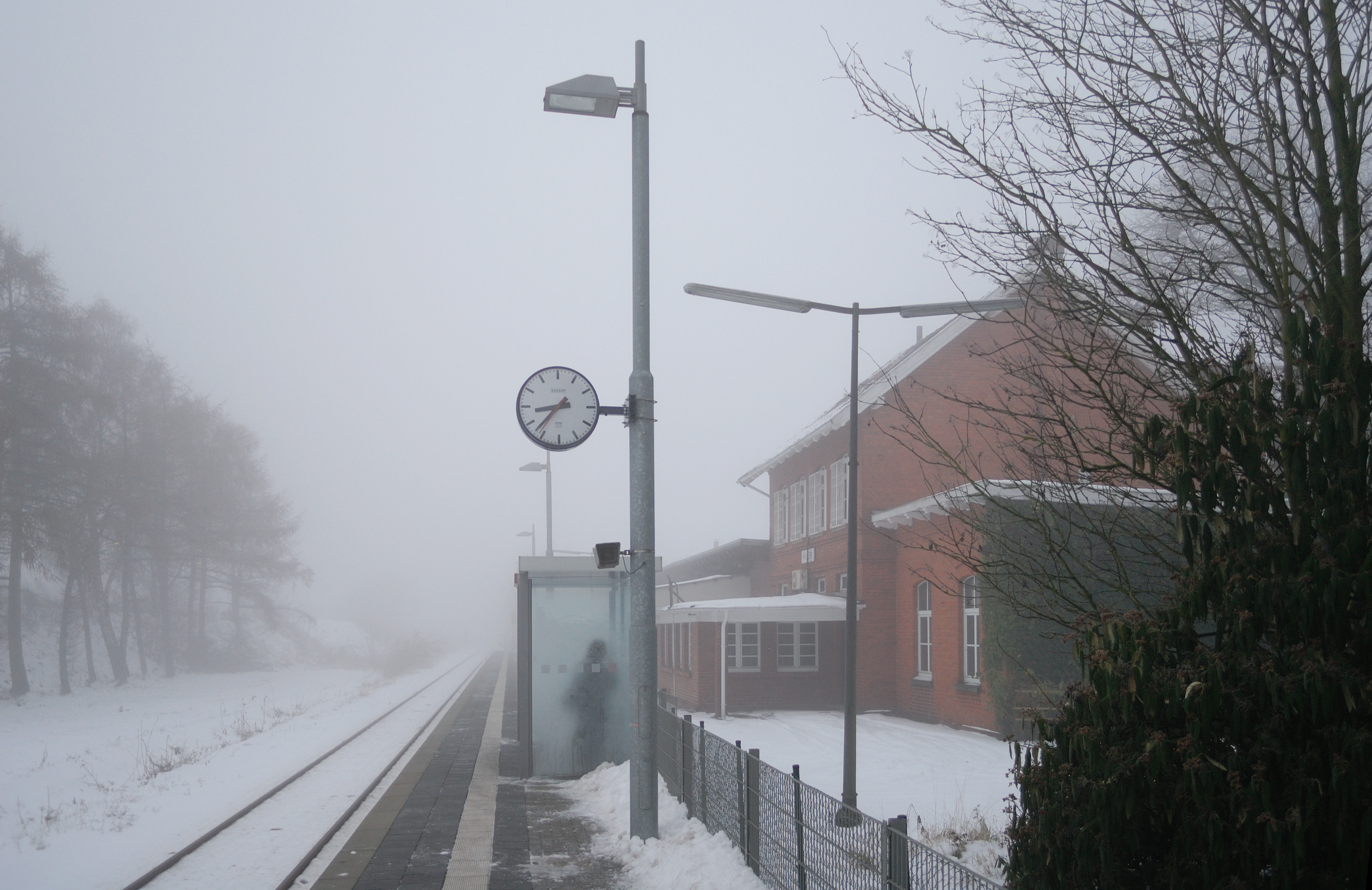
- Hilter railway station with the former station building which no longer belongs to Deutsche Bahn

General information
- Location: Hilter am Teutoburger Wald, Lower Saxony; Germany
- Coordinates: 52°08′05″N 8°9′8″E
- System: Through station
- Line: Osnabrück–Brackwede railway (KBS 402)
- Platforms: 1

Other information
- Station code: n/a
- DS100 code: HHIL
- Fare zone: VOS: 415 (VOS Plus tickets accepted on RB75 between Osnabrück Hbf and Dissen-Bad Rothenfelde); Westfalentarif: 94150 (VOS transitional tariff)

Services
Preceding station	NordWestBahn	Following station
Wellendorf towards Osnabrück Hbf	RB 75	Dissen-Bad Rothenfelde towards Bielefeld Hbf
Location

Hilter is a railway station located in Hilter, Germany. The station is on the Osnabrück–Brackwede railway. The train services are operated by NordWestBahn.

== Train services ==
The station is served by the following services:

- Local services RB 75 Osnabrück - Halle (Westf) - Bielefeld
