= Twist, Germany =

Twist
- Municipality
- Flag Coat of arms

- Location of Twist within Emsland district
- Interactive map of Twist
- Location within Germany Location within Lower Saxony
- Coordinates: 52°37′N 07°02′E
- Country: Germany
- State: Lower Saxony
- District: Emsland

Government
  - Mayor (2019–24): Petra Lübbers (CDU)

Area
  - Total: 105.61 km^{2} (40.78 sq mi)
- Elevation: 16 m (52 ft)

Population (2025-12-31)
  - Total: 9,847
  - Density: 93.24/km^{2} (241.5/sq mi)
- Time zone: UTC+01:00 (CET)
  - Summer (DST): UTC+02:00 (CEST)
- Postal codes: 49767
- Dialling codes: 0 59 36
- Vehicle registration: EL
- Website: www.twist-emsland.de

Twist is a municipality in the Emsland district, in Lower Saxony, Germany. It is situated directly on the Dutch border.

Situation of the local parts in the municipality of Twist:

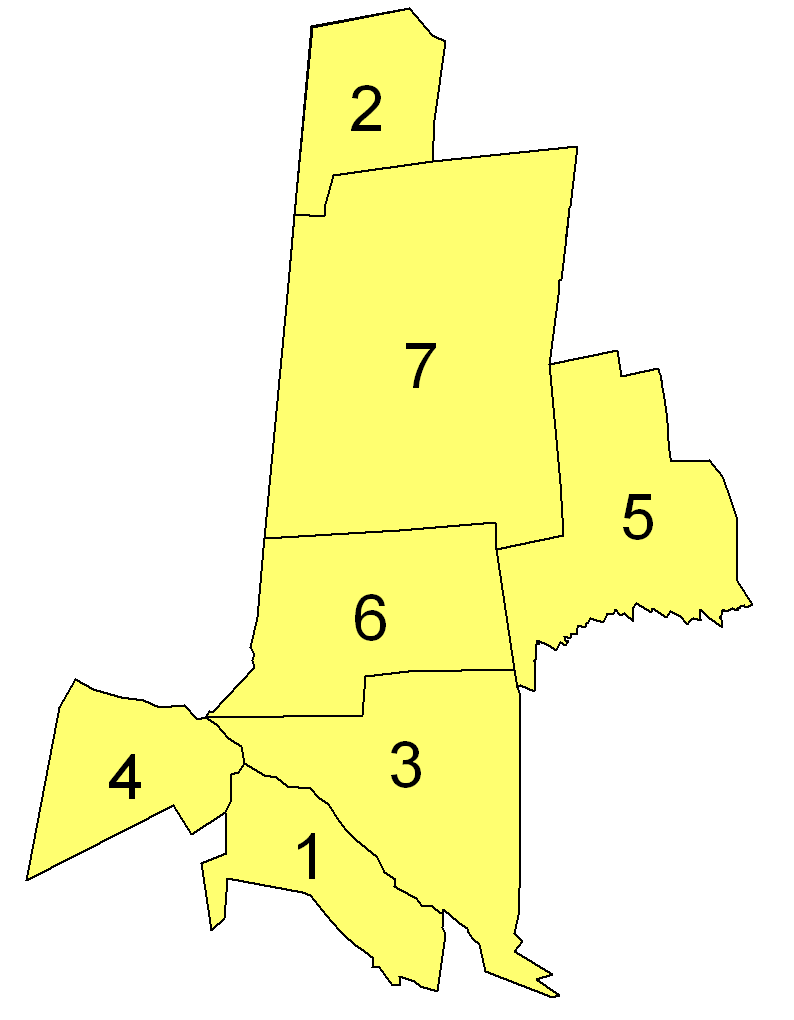

1. Adorf
2. Hebelermeer
3. Hesepertwist (Twist-Siedlung)
4. Neuringe
5. Rühlerfeld and Rühlermoor
6. Rühlertwist (Twist-Bült)
7. Schöninghsdorf and Provinzialmoor

More than half of the population lives in the center of the municipality (i.e. Twist-Siedlung and Bült). The other half is spread over the other villages, of which Schöningsdorf (population about 1100) and Rühlerfeld (900) are the largest. The other villages are smaller (Adorf about 500, Hebelermeer 400, Neuringe 300 inhabitants).

== History ==
The settlement in the area of today's municipality Twist began quite late around the year 1784. The prince-bishop of Münster Max Franz satisfied the wishes of some "Heuerleute", a kind of farmer, from the nearby village of Hesepe to settle down in the bog "Twist". This was the starting point of the settlement in Twist; to be more precise it starts at the street of houses which is nowadays called "Alt-Hesepertwist". The ground was at that time quite infertile because of its composition and did just allow a meager livelihood and so the people did not live in any comfort. The construction of the canal "Nord-Süd-Kanal" about 100 years later brought significant improvements in the quality of life of the people, because the canal allowed a systematic drainage and removal of the peat.

In the 1950s the economic revival finally arrived on the one hand by finding larger oil deposits and on the other hand by commissioning of the production site of the Dutch plastics company Wavin. These two factors were over some decades the driving forces for the economical rise of Twist.

In 1986 Twist celebrated its 200th anniversary. The anniversary festivities ended with a pageant which had respect to the history and current circumstances in Twist. For instance one of the numerous parade floats showed a detailed replica of the church St. Georg (biggest church in Twist).

In the 1990s the two main columns of Twist's economy, oil production and the plastic production declined more and more; and economic hard times meant many people lost their jobs. With the finishing of the autobahn 31 at the end of the 1990s this negative development was stopped by siting new companies especially in the industrial area close to the autobahn.

In August/September 2011 Twist celebrated its 225th anniversary. The 10-day-long festival started with a "Twist-Schau" (Twist Show). This show was performed like a play in Low German language and telling the history of Twist in a humorous way, with its good old times, but also the very hard living conditions of the first settlers, the loss of loved family members during WWII and the upcoming prosperity caused by the fast economic growth of the last 60 years that offers people of about 30 different nations a new home in Twist.

One of the following days of the festival was themed as "Tag der Vereine" (Day of the Associations) presenting all sporting, cultural and welfare associations in Twist. It showed the wide range of activities for spare time and hobbies. Another motto of one of the festival days was "Twist macht Musik" (Twist plays music) where all choirs in Twist performed their songs and left the audience very impressed.

Part of the festival were also concerts by Queen and Pink Floyd cover bands. The festival finally ended by presenting a pageant related to historical and present developments in Twist.

== Origin of the name ==
The origin of the name of the municipality Twist has nothing to do with the dance style of the same title. Due to a long disagreement with the Dutch Kingdom about the way the border between both countries should take it was common language use to speak about "Twistrich" or "Twist Gebiet" (Twist area). In Low German "Twistrich" or "Twist Gebiet" has a meaning similar to "disputed border". This language was the official language at that time and is still partly in usage.

The name is commonly mispronounced as locals pronounce it "Tweest".

New research results from Jürgen Udolph, a known scientist in the fields of onomastics, shows that the name Twist probably has its origin in the words "twistel" in the meaning of "Zwiesel" or "Zweiung", that means something is at a bifurcation. In this meaning also words like "zwieträchtig", "twisten" and "in Zweispalt, Streit sein" (in English: discrepancy, dispute) belong to the explanation of the origin of the name Twist. The conclusion of Udolph is, that the name of Twist means something like "separated settlement, a place located at a (stream) bifurcation".

== Landmarks ==
=== Church St. Vinzenz von Paul zu Hebelermeer ===
The parish church in the district Heblermeer houses two rococo busts of Ignatius of Loyola and Francisco de Xavier created by the sculptor Johann Heinrich König (1705–1784).

=== Church St. Franziskus ===
In December 1928 the construction work on the church started. The architect Theo Burlage designed the church in the style of expressionism. One year after starting construction the first service in the church was celebrated on December 8, 1929. In August 1930 bishop Berning did consecrated the church. The altar crucifix was designed by Wolfdietrich Stein. With a height of 5 meters it fills the complete height and width of the sanctuary.

The church spire has clock faces on three of its sides. Contrary to ordinary clock faces, these ones do not show numbers. The top figure is an Iron Cross with the date of 1914 and 1918 (duration of World War I). The other 33 figures on the clock faces are name tags with the names of the soldiers killed in action from the villages Schönighsdorf and Provinzialmoor.

=== Protestant church in Neuringe ===
An exceptional feature is the Protestant church in the district of Neuringe, because this church boasts one of the oldest and most valuable organs (constructed in 1719) of the Protestant national church. The church itself was constructed in 1904. As in many villages at that time, there was no money for both construction of the church and the buying of inventory. Therefore, a used organ was bought. Sometimes, as in this case, the used ones have a higher value nowadays than organs that were built in the 1900s.

=== Center of Twist ===
In the center of the municipality of Twist numerous retailers are located, such as grocery stores, a travel agency, a bank and so on. Also the city hall and the police station is situated in the center of Twist. A special attraction in the center is the museum for crude oil and natural gas (Erdöl-Erdgas-Museum Twist) and also the "Heimathaus Twist". The Heimathaus Twist is known for legendary blues, folk, and jazz concerts.

=== Landscape ===
In 2006 the German counties Emsland and Grafschaft Bentheim founded together with the Dutch province Drenthe the "Internationaler Naturpark Moor" (International Nature Park Bog) (wetlands). This park stretches across big parts of the municipality Twist. The park has a unique biota and is the wintering grounds for numerous migratory birds every year.

Up to the settlement and cultivation in the 19th century, the area was one of the biggest peat moss areas in Europe with a size of more than 1,200 km^{2}. In recent years several projects have started to block ditches and generate a water logging of the area for renaturation. A very successful example for the renaturation in the nature park is the Dutch part of the park, where already in the 1960s first projects started and led to a fully restored peat moss area where very rare plants and animals found a new home.

== Recreational activity and culture ==
=== Culture ===
The "Heimathaus Twist" is a reconstructed old farm house located in the center of Twist. It is known for blues and folk concerts which also take place several times a year. However, several events especially for children are also organized by the team of the "Heimathaus Twist". Directly beside the "Heimathaus Twist" the museum for crude oil and natural gas is located. It shows several exhibits on this topic and the historical development of the extraction of crude oil and natural gas. The crude oil and natural gas industry has a long history in the area of Twist for this reason it was sometimes also called the German Texas.

=== Recreational activity ===
In every district of Twist there are several sport clubs where soccer is the dominant sport, but basketball, table-tennis, competitive dance, horseback riding, swimming, tennis, handball and gymnastics are also offered.

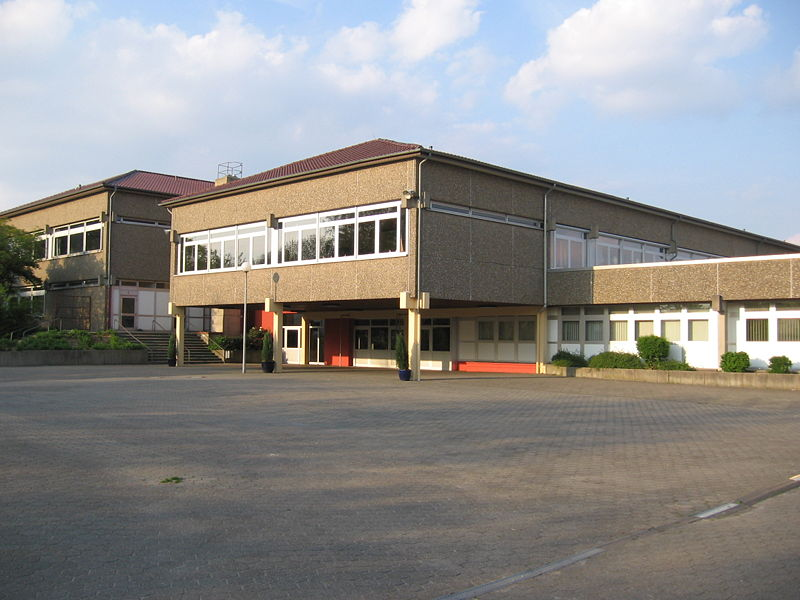
Schule am See (Junior High School)

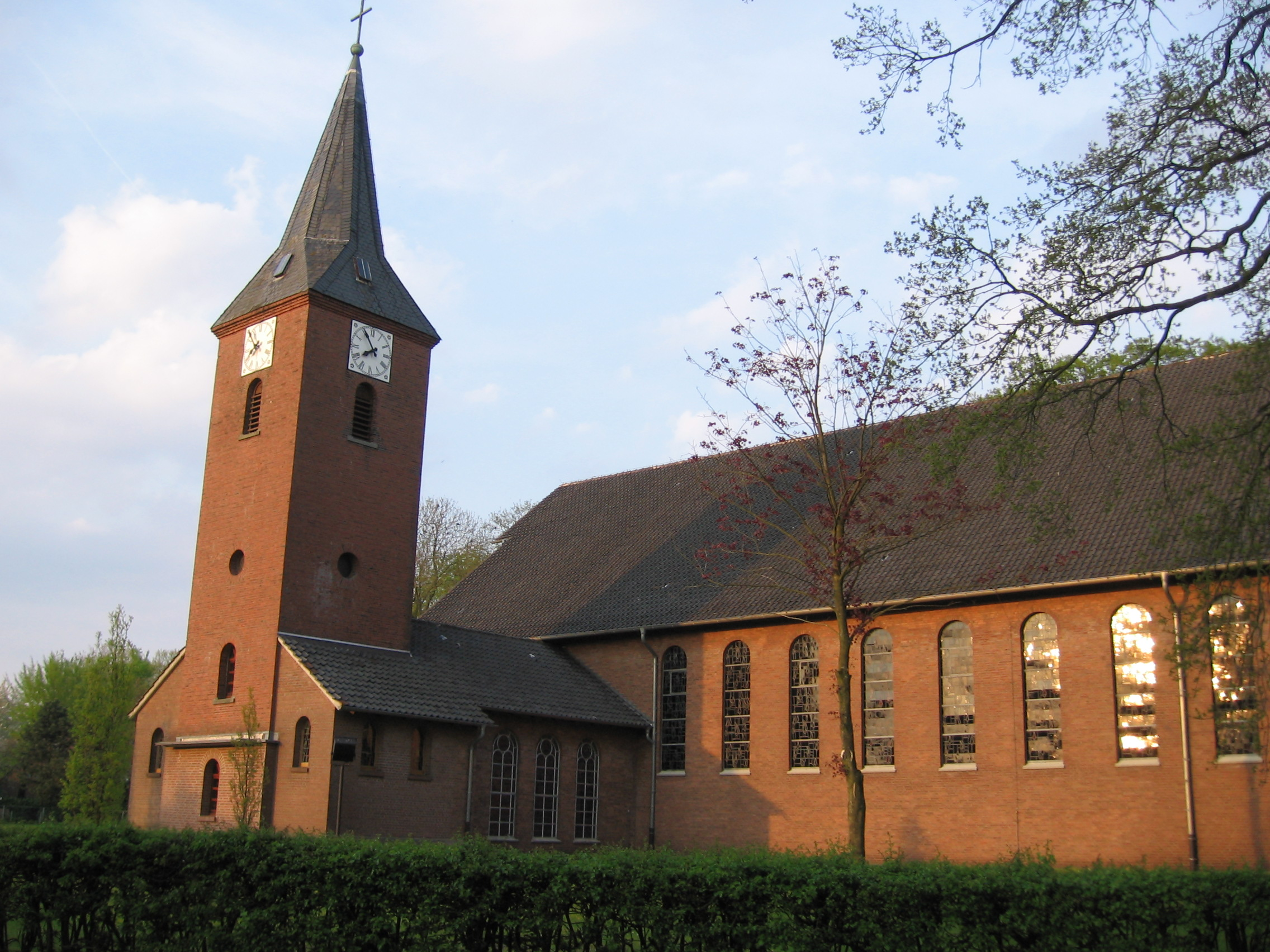
Catholic church St. Georg (District Twist-Bült)

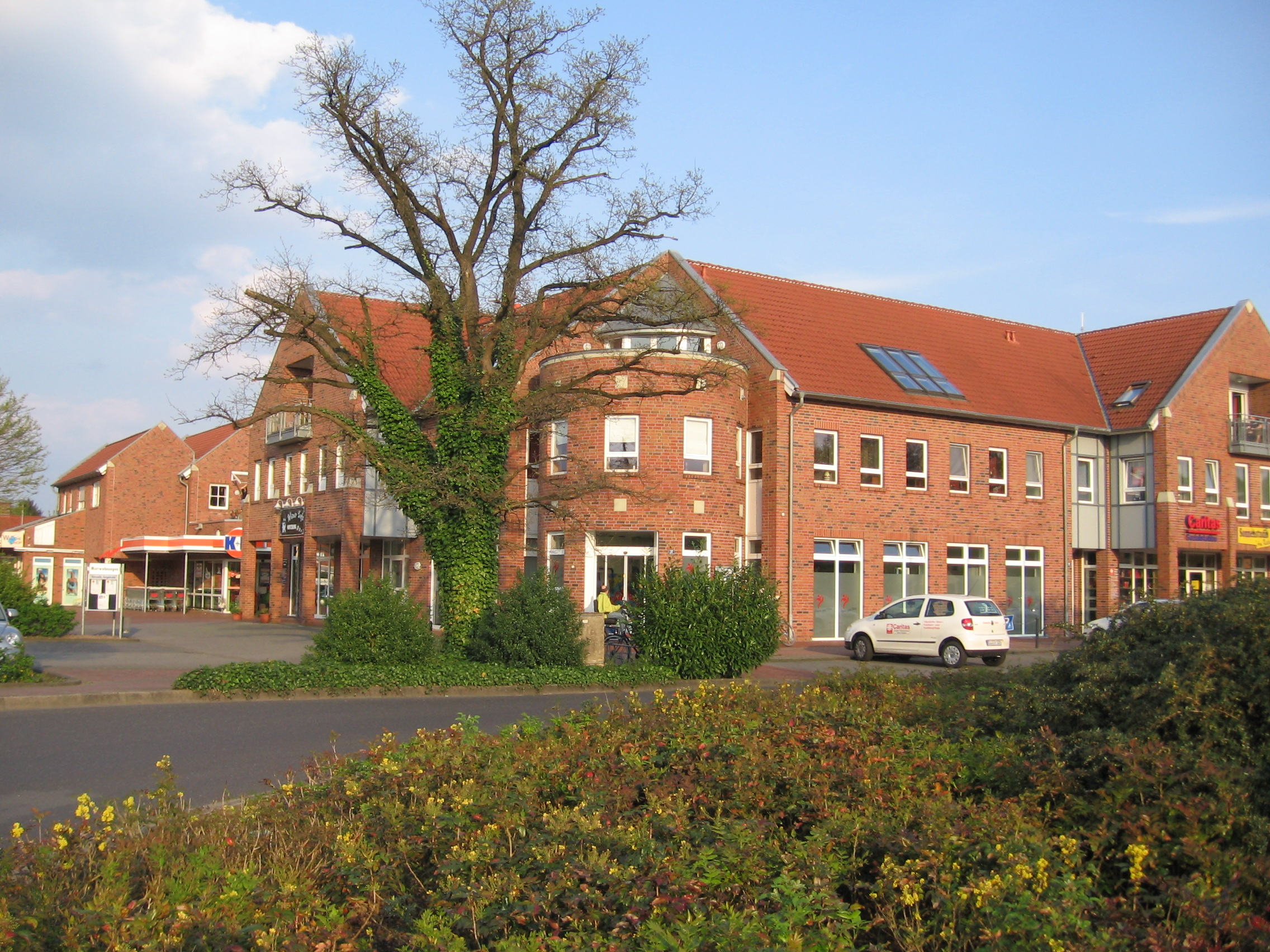
Commercial building in the Center of Twist (District Twist-Mitte)

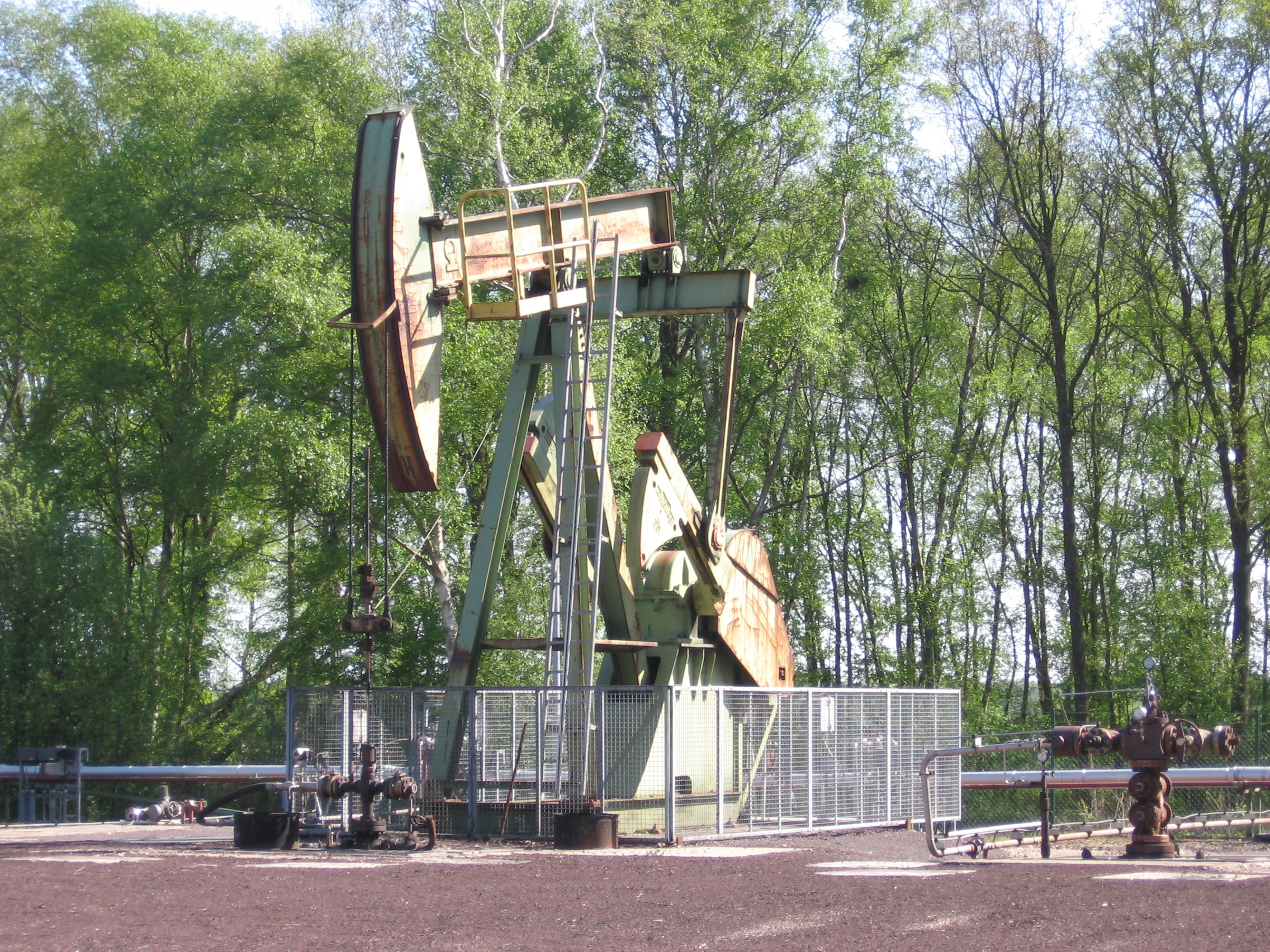
Typical view: Oil pump

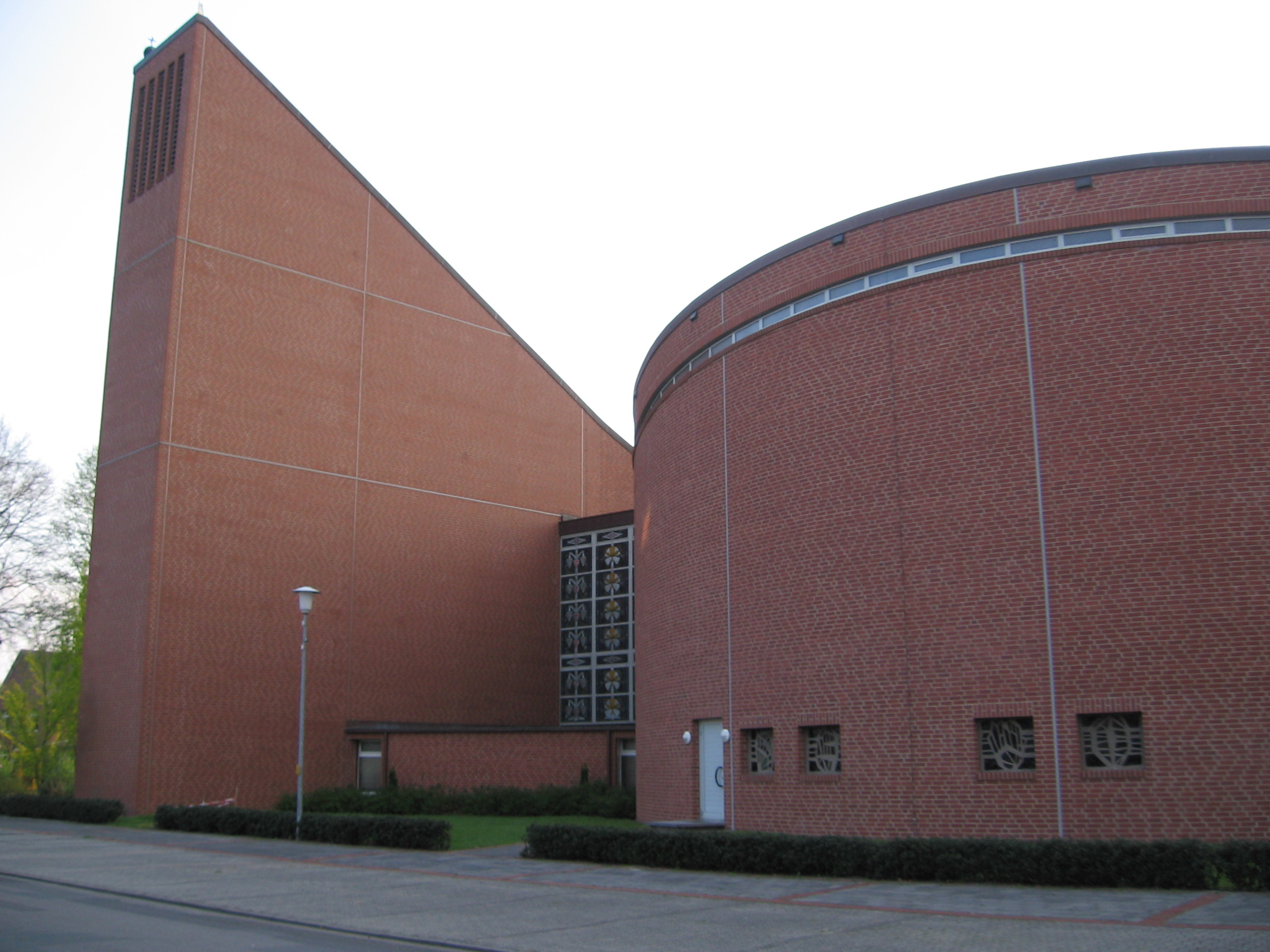
Catholic church St. Ansgar (District Twist-Siedlung)

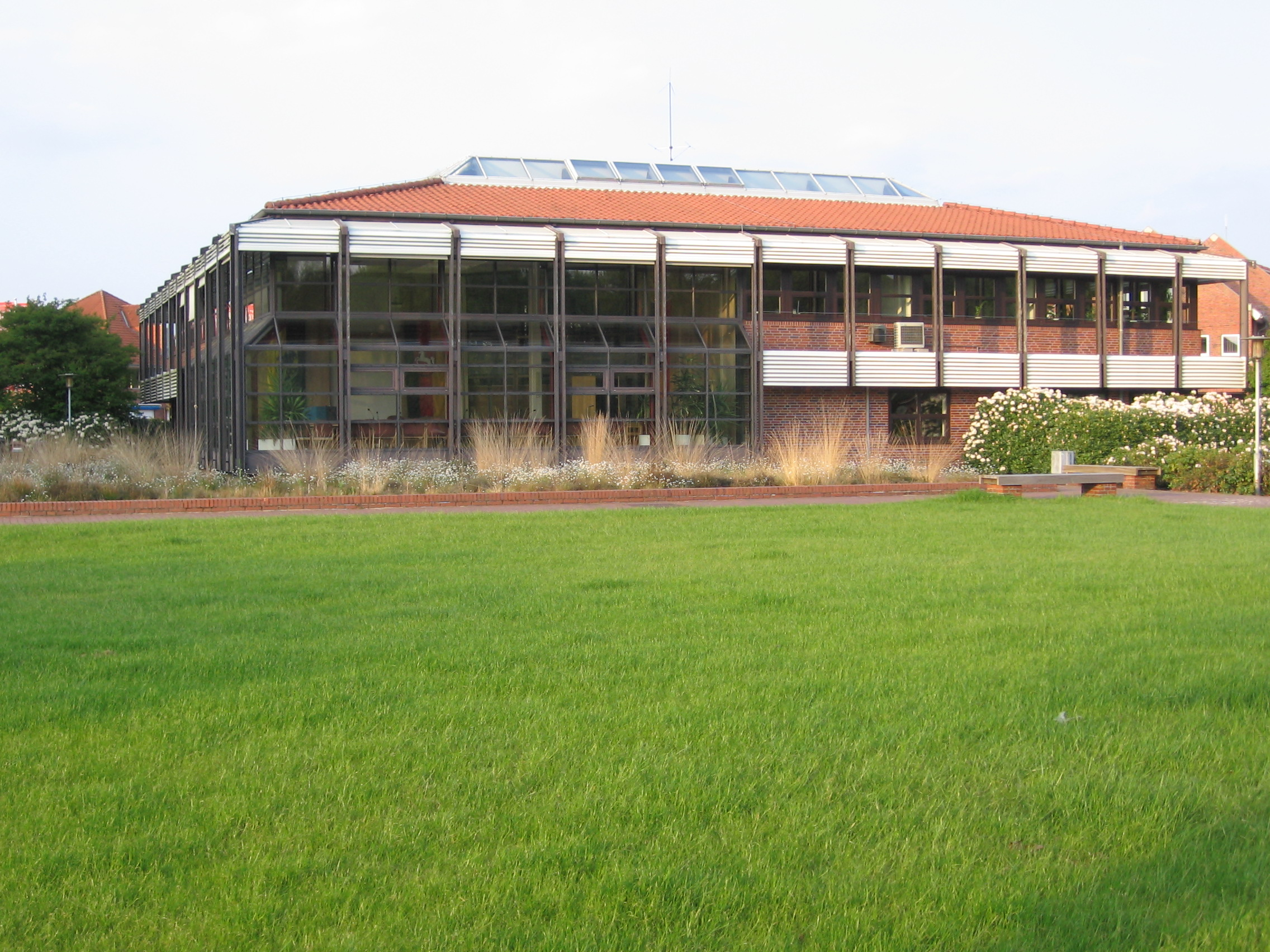
City hall Twist (District Twist-Mitte)

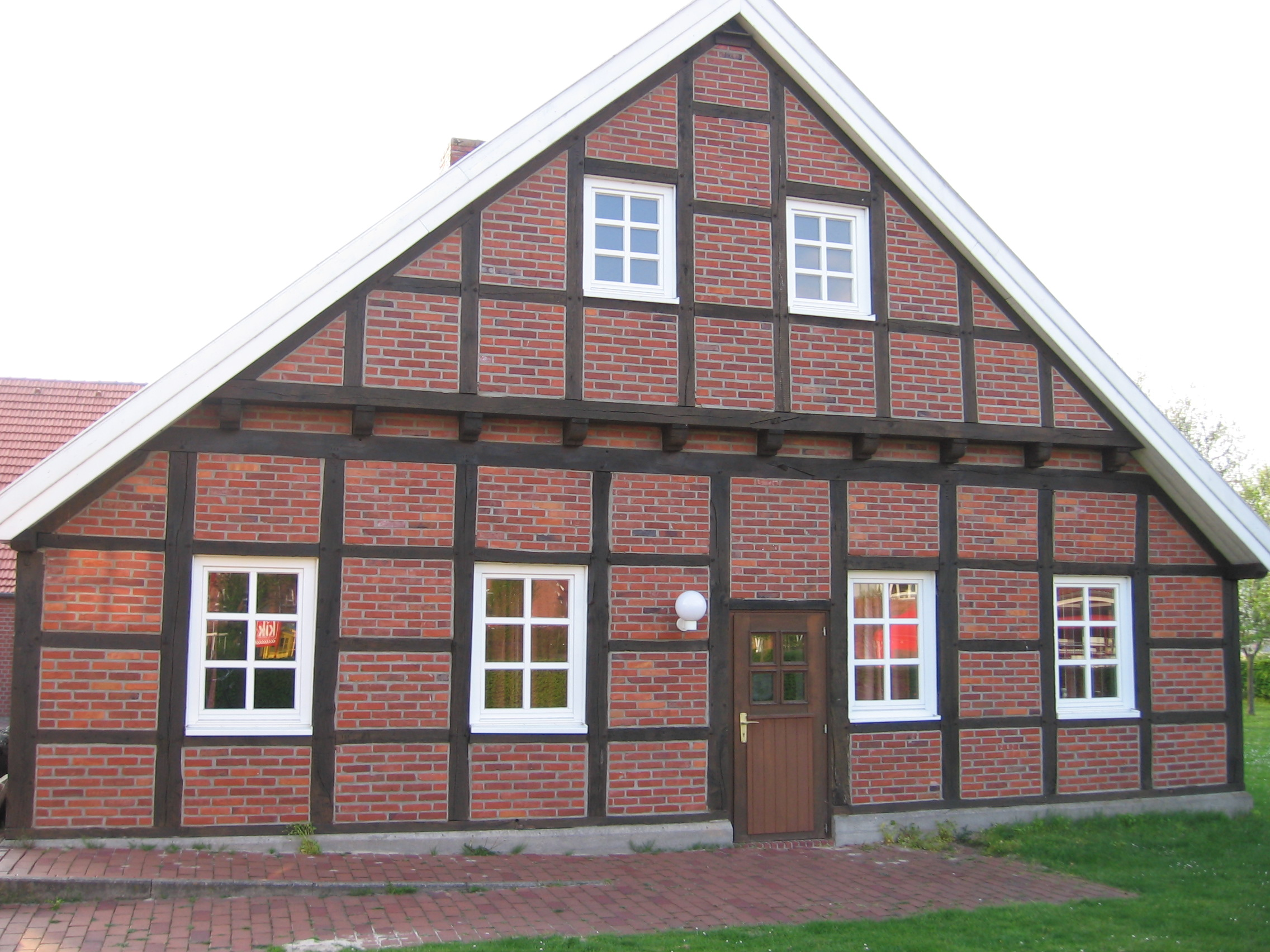
Heimathaus Twist (District Twist-Mitte) known for legendary Blues and Jazz nights

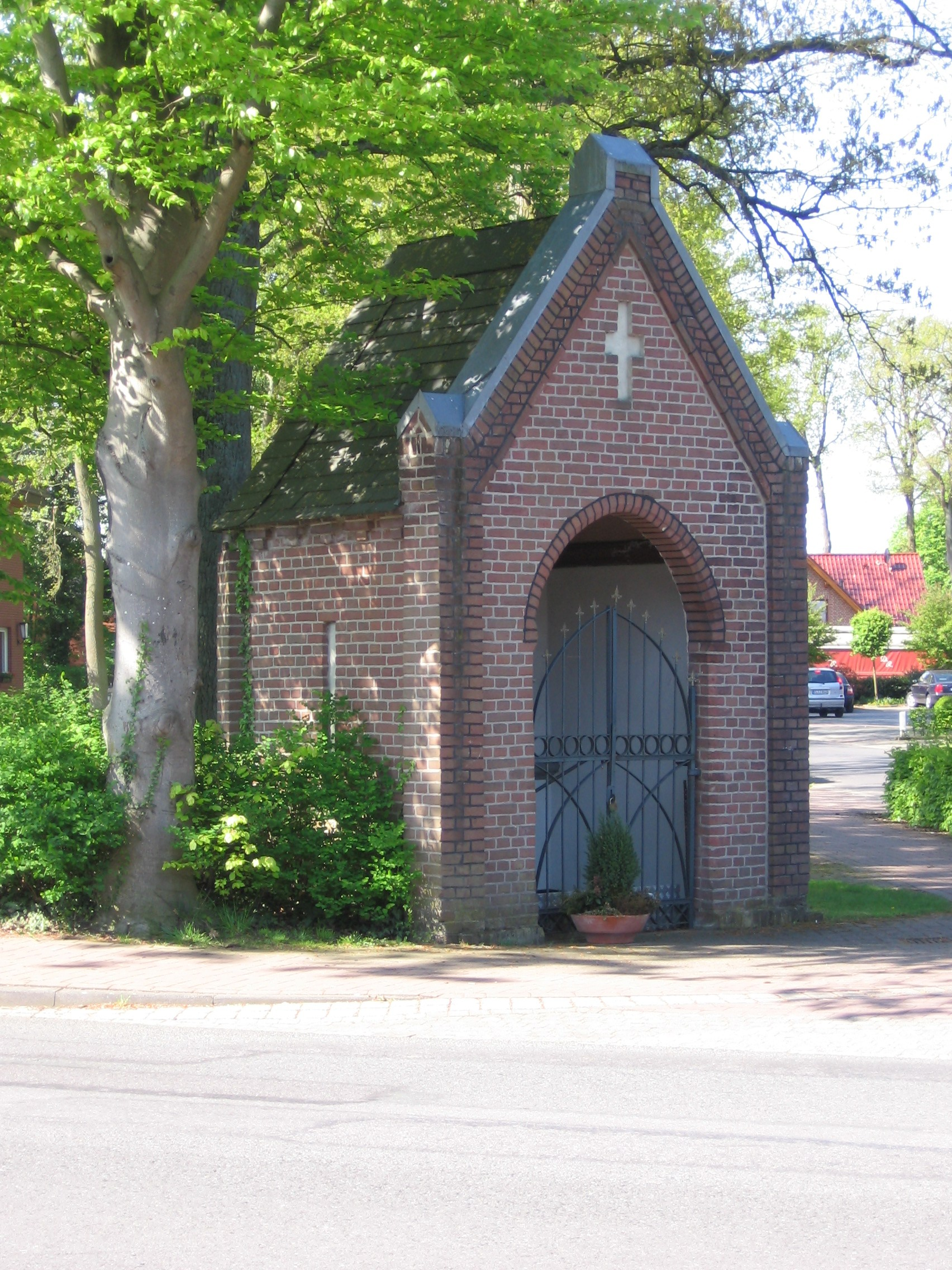
Grotto in the district Twist-Bült

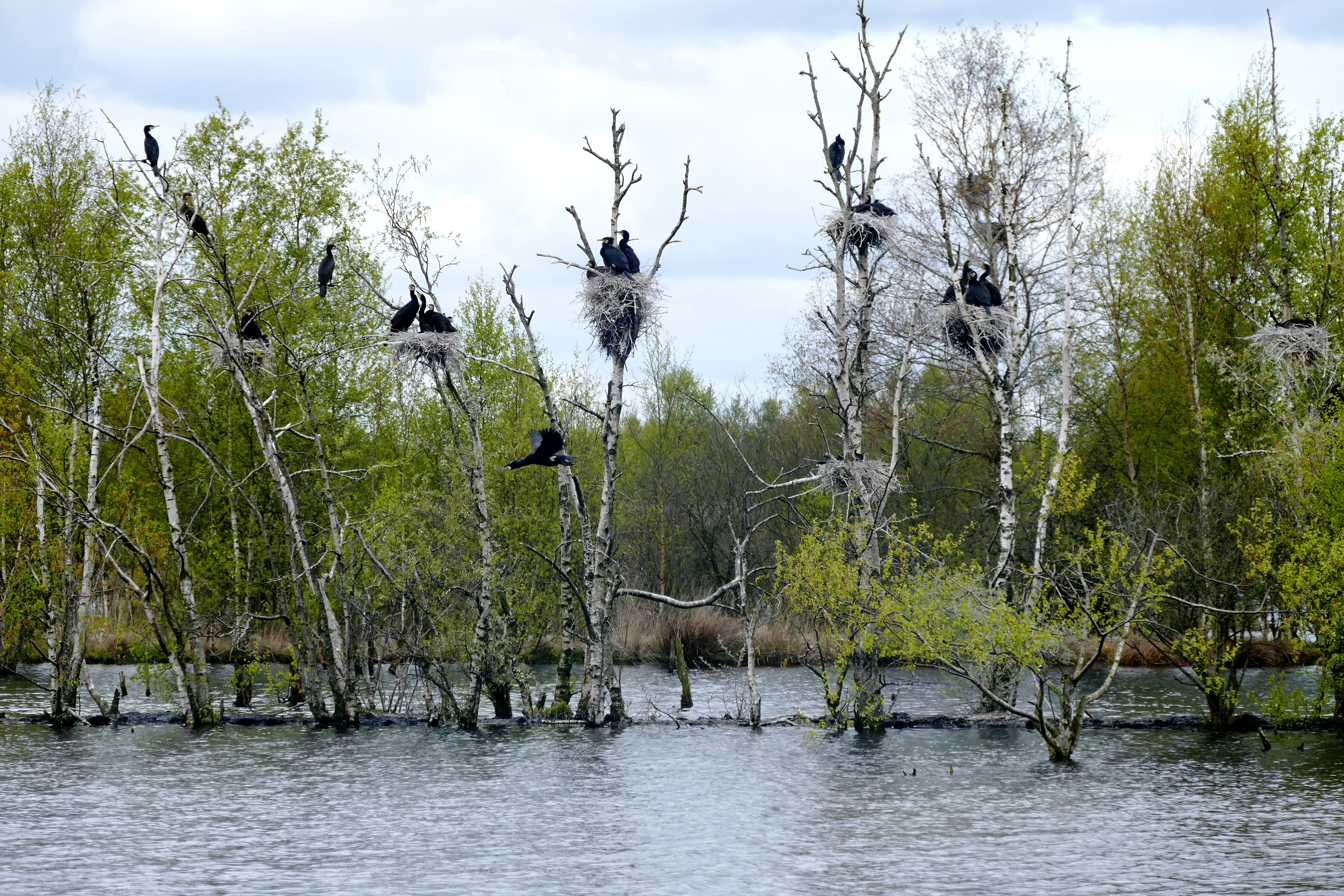
Cormorant colony (Internationaler Naturpark Bourtanger Moor-Bargerveen)

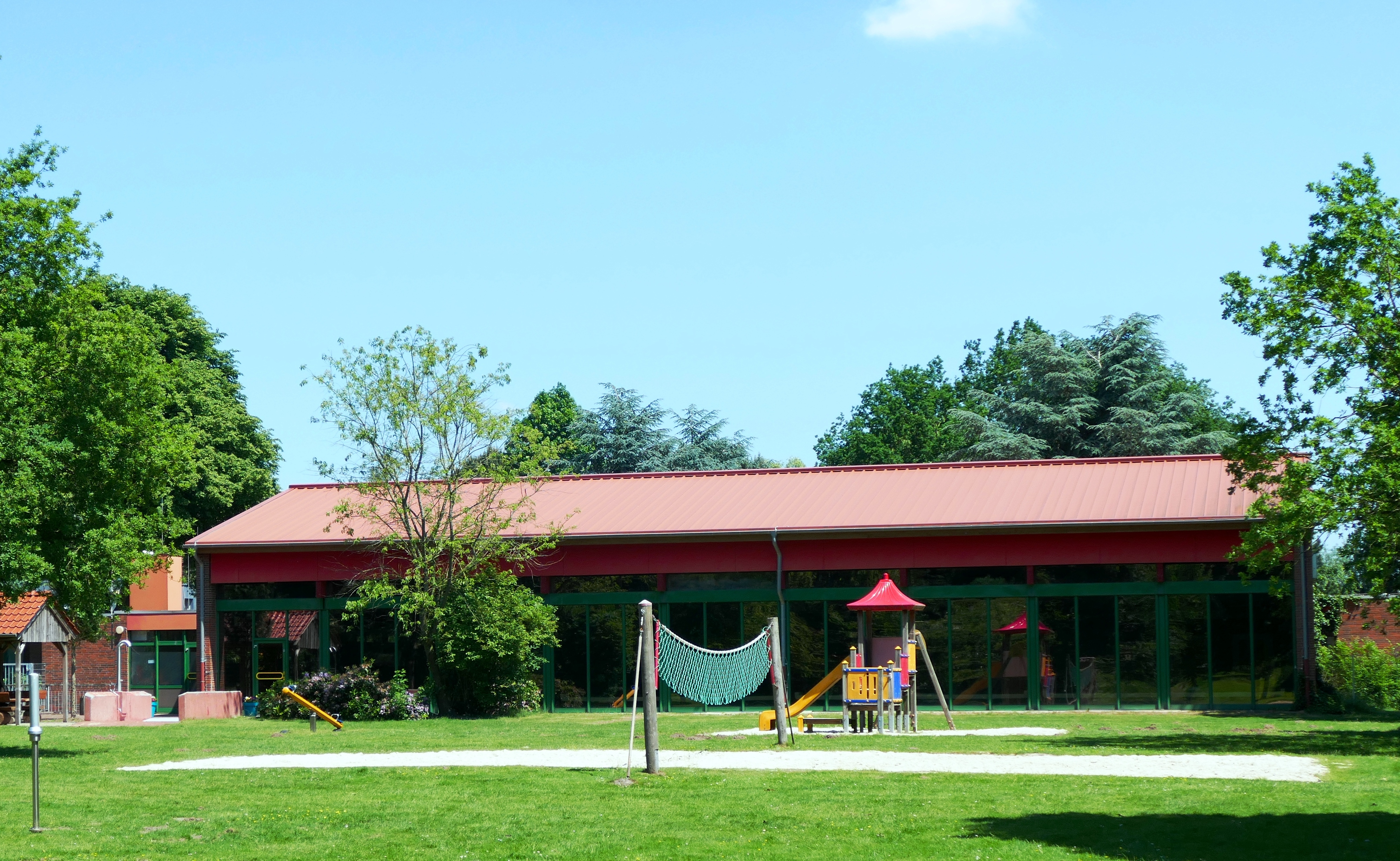
Public indoor swimming pool (District Twist-Mitte)

== Family policy ==
In May 2007 the town council decided measures to support families with children. Hence families with two or three children get a special concession on a building land for a one-family house. Families with four children get a building site for free. For this rule limited in time (till 31 December 2009) children count who are younger than 15 years and born the first 10 years after purchase.

== Economy and Infrastructure ==
=== Traffic ===
==== By car ====
Twist has a direct connection to the Autobahn 31 which acts as north–south route between the North Sea and the Ruhr. Twist is also connected to Europastraße 233 which is constructed on German side like an Autobahn to the connection point with Autobahn 31 and on Dutch side it already has the status as Autobahn A 37. This Europastraße (E 233) connects the metropolis Rotterdam, Amsterdam with Hamburg and finally Scandinavia. On the German side it's intended over the next years to follow the Dutch side and to convert the road over the whole distance into an Autobahn.

==== Air traffic ====
The closest international airport is Münster Osnabrück Airport in the German city Greven. The airport is about 90 km away from Twist and easy to reach by using the Autobahn 31 and later changing to Autobahn 30.

Düsseldorf is the closest international hub for intercontinental flights. The distance to the airport is approximately 170 km (1,5 hours by car) and for the whole travel distance it is possible to use the Autobahn. Düsseldorf Airport can be reached directly on the Autobahn 31 and later, after changing to Autobahn 44, leaving at the exit airport (Ausfahrt Flughafen).

Amsterdam Airport Schiphol is another airport close by. The airport is about 200 km away and easy to reach on the Dutch high-speed road network. The Dutch "Autobahn" A 37 starts in Twist and for the whole distance to the airport an Autobahn can be used.

=== Economy ===
Till the middle of the nineteen-nineties the crude oil, natural gas, and peat industry dominated the economy in Twist. Especially in these industries many employees lost their job at that time. Since then many small and medium size business companies have settled down in the area of Twist especially in the industrial park at the autobahn. The biggest employer in Twist is the Dutch company Wavin. This company is European market leader for plastic pipe systems.

=== Tourism ===
In recent years tourism has also become an important factor, where the focus of tourism is on the district of Neuringe. In addition to several holiday flats there is also a campground with a public lake for bathing and a farm for horseback riding. Especially this farm theme park enjoys great popularity among the younger guests. Furthermore, within the area of this farm is an indoor children's playground which is especially suitable for children up to the age of 12.

== Education ==
In Twist there are 5 grade schools and one junior high. After a bigger replacement and newly constructed building in 2007, this junior high acts nowadays as full-time school. In 2009 the grade schools were also transformed into all day schools. By carrying out modernisation at the schools it is guaranteed nowadays that the students get a warm meal and are supervised throughout the day.
