= Dissen, Lower Saxony =

Dissen am Teutoburger Wald
- Town
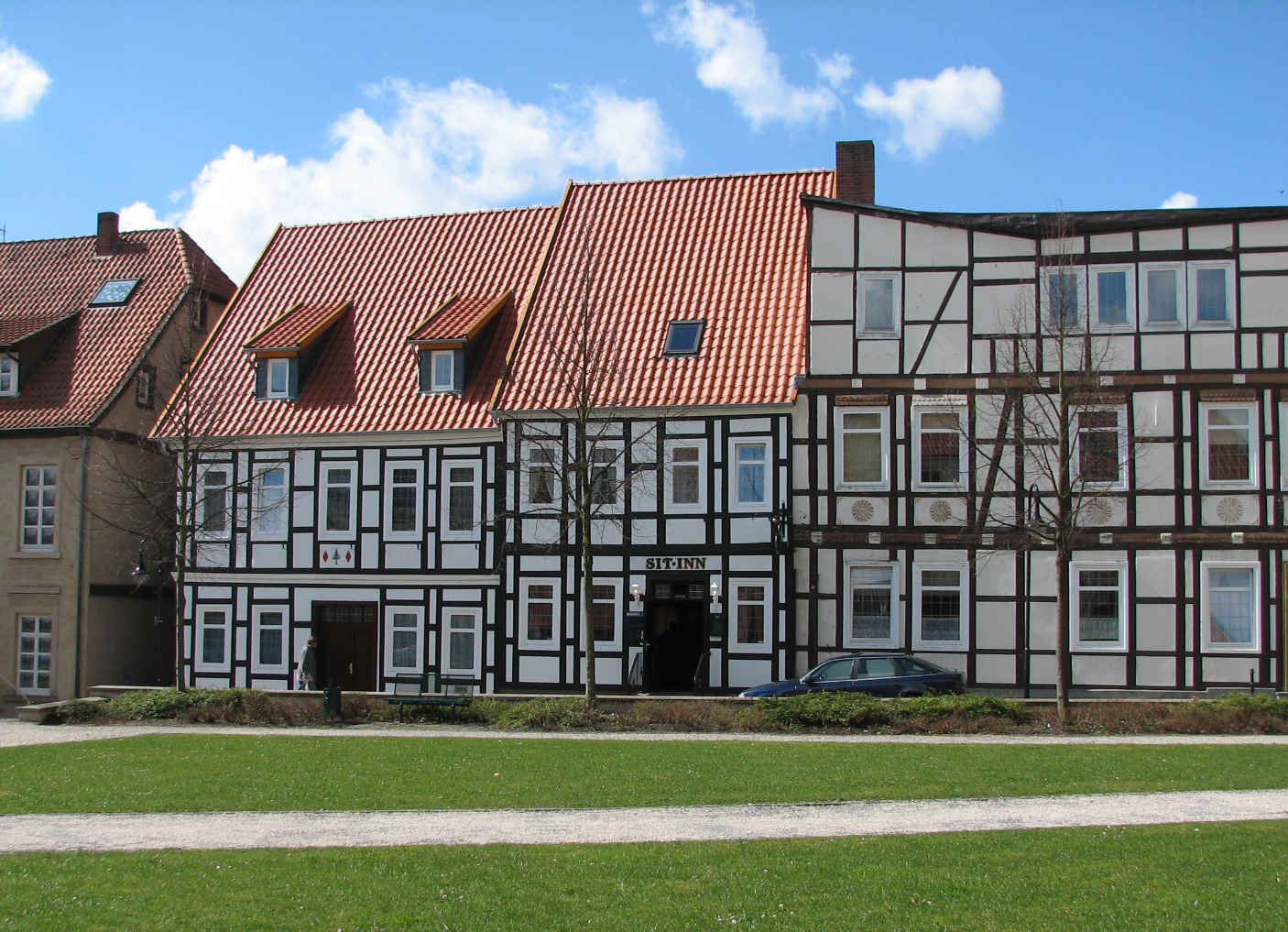

- Coat of arms

- Location of Dissen am Teutoburger Wald within Osnabrück district
- Interactive map of Dissen am Teutoburger Wald
- Location within Germany Location within Lower Saxony
- Coordinates: 52°07′N 08°12′E
- Country: Germany
- State: Lower Saxony
- District: Osnabrück

Government
  - Mayor (2020–25): Eugen Görlitz
  - Governing parties: CDU

Area
  - Total: 31.9 km^{2} (12.3 sq mi)
- Elevation: 109 m (358 ft)

Population (2025-12-31)
  - Total: 10,440
  - Density: 327/km^{2} (848/sq mi)
- Time zone: UTC+01:00 (CET)
  - Summer (DST): UTC+02:00 (CEST)
- Postal codes: 49201
- Dialling codes: 05421
- Vehicle registration: OS, BSB, MEL, WTL
- Website: www.dissen.de

Dissen am Teutoburger Wald (German pronunciation: [ˈdɪsn̩ ʔam ˈtɔʏtoˌbʊʁɡɐ ˈvalt], lit. 'Dissen on the Teutoburg Forest') is an old charactered town in the district of Osnabrück, in Lower Saxony, Germany. It is situated in the Teutoburg Forest, approximately 20 km southeast of Osnabrück.

== Geography ==
Dissen is located on the southern slope of the Teutoburg Forest at the transition to East Westphalia. The highest point is the Hankenüll (307 meters) on the northeastern city limits. From east to west is the city area about eight kilometers, from north to south about ten kilometers. The land use is composed as follows: 43.8 percent agricultural use, 41.7 percent forest area, 9.8 percent building and courtyard areas and 4.7 percent traffic and other areas.

Dissen is bordered to the north by Hilter and Melle, to the west by Bad Rothenfelde, and to the south and east by the North Rhine-Westphalian towns of Versmold and Borgholzhausen in the Gütersloh district.

The city consists of the districts Dissen, Aschen, Erpen, and Nolle.

== History ==
Dissen was first mentioned in documents in 822, when Louis the Pious handed over the Meierhof in Dissen to the Bishop of Osnabrück. Since when the place exists is not known.

A public school with three classes was founded in 1857. In April 1832, a major fire destroyed 32 buildings, 200 people lost their roof over their heads. On November 8, 1951 Dissen received the city rights. The name "Dissen am Teutoburger Wald" was officially ordered by the Lower Saxony Ministry of the Interior with effect from 1 January 1976. Since 1 March 2005 Dissen has a full-time mayor. Since May 26, 2019 Eugen Görlitz (CDU) is mayor.

Origin of the place name

Old names of the place are 1217, 1284, 1325 (de) Disne, 1223, 1282, 1402, 1412, 1442, 1456/58, 1463, 1556, (after 1605) (de) Dissen, 1225 (in) Dyssene, (approx 1240) Dissene, 1246 (de) Dissenen, 1271 (de) Dissine, 1279 (in) Dhissene, 1402 Dyssen, 1412 Dyssen, 16th c. Dyssen and 1565 Dissenn. Difficult, perhaps too low-German hazy in a form Disina "misty, hazy area", perhaps referring to the moorland at Dissener Bach. Or maybe as Desina> Dissen to North Germanic anord. of the "haystack, ëschober", norw. desja "small pile", which was also borrowed in English. Then about hill town. Hard to solve so far.

=== Incorporations ===
On April 1, 1974, there was an area exchange between the city of Dissen and the neighboring community Bad Rothenfelde, in which Dissen gained a little more than 100 inhabitants, but also ceded nearly 600 inhabitants.

=== Population development ===
Year	Population
1885	1536
1910	2016
1925	2182
1933	2515
1939	2617
1950	4340
1956	4353
1961	6962
1970	7433
1973	7976
1975	7754
1985	8108
1987	8060
1990	8401
1995	9010
2000	9222
2005	9322
2010	9271
2011	9396
2014	9270
2015	9390
2017	9689
2018	9882
2019	9998

== Politics ==
City Council

The following table shows the municipal election results since 1996.

Council of the city of Dissen: election results and city councils
	CDU		SPD		GRÜNE		FDP		UWG		Total		Poll
Legislative period	%	seats	%	seats	%	seats	%	seats	%	seats	%	seats	%
1996–2001	37,9	9	46,2	11	2,8	1	5,6	1	7,5	1	100	23	64,5
2001–2006	45,3	12	42,6	11	2,4	0	3,6	0	6,1	2	100	25	58,6
2006–2011	45,9	10	40,1	9	4,1	1	4,8	1	5,1	1	100	22	48,7
2011–2016	40,9	9	39,4	9	7,2	1	3,0	1	9,5	2	100	22	50,1
2016–2021	45,3	10	25,7	5	7,7	2	–	–	21,3	5	100	22	49,6
Percentages rounded. Sources: Landesbetrieb für Statistik und Kommunikationstechnologie Niedersachsen, Landkreis Osnabrück.

Mayors

- Georg Majerski (2005-2011)
- Hartmut Nümann (2011-2019)
- Eugen Görlitz (2019-Incumbent)
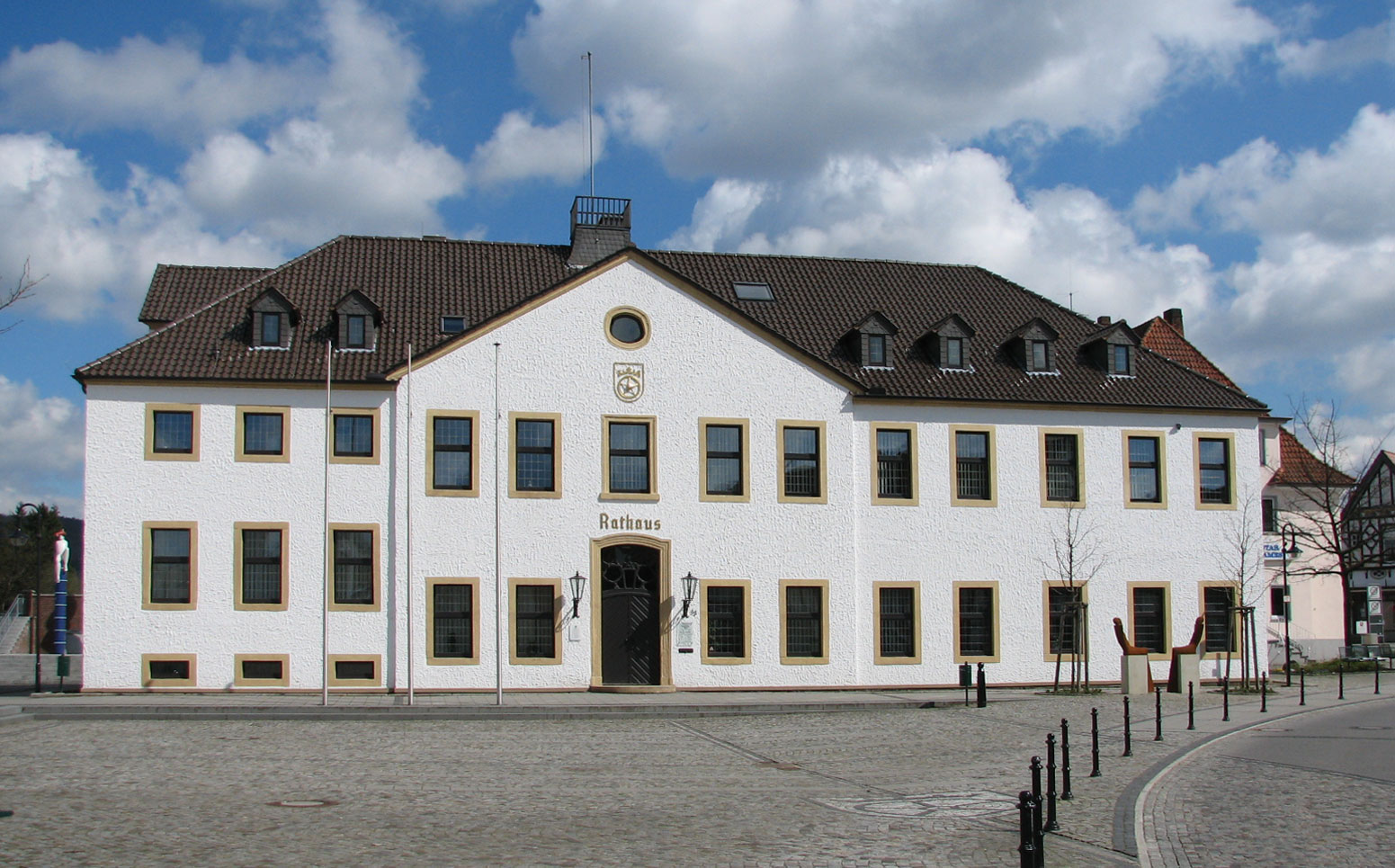
  Town Hall of Dissen

=== Coat of arms ===
Blazon: In green under a golden crown a golden wheel.

=== Twin towns and sister cities ===
- Germany Dissen-Striesow, Landkreis Spree-Neiße, Brandenburg
- Germany Gudensberg, Schwalm-Eder-Kreis, Hesse
- Germany Thum, Erzgebirgskreis, Saxony

== Main sights ==
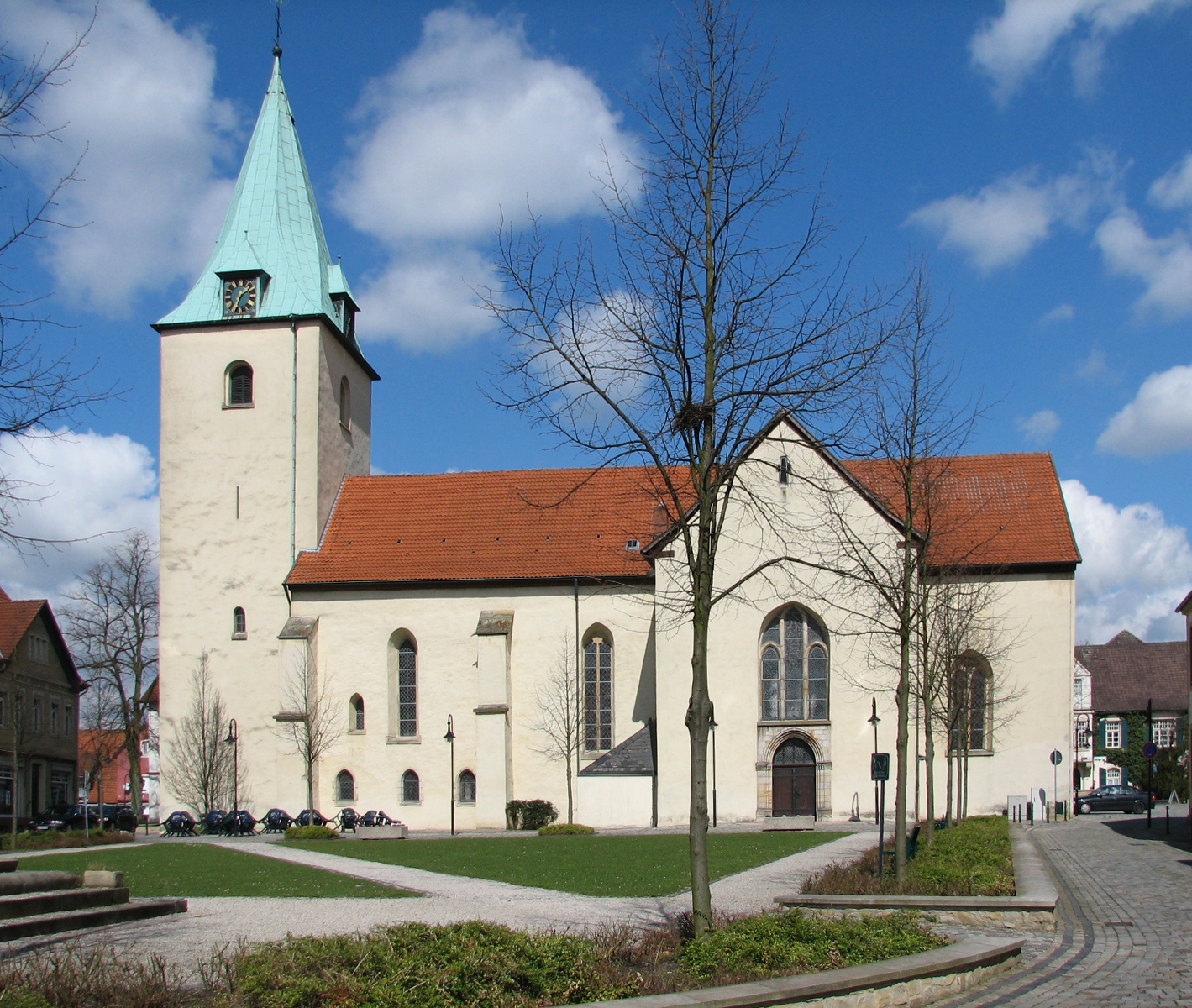
St. Mauritius

- Fernmeldeturm Dissen (with viewing platform)
- Frommenhof
- St. Mauritius (Dissen) (13. century)

== Notable people ==
- Rainer Spiering (* 1956), Politician (CDU)
- Andy Grote (* 1968), Politician (SPD)
- Gerwald Claus-Brunner (1972–2016), Politician (Pirates)
