= Erdöl-Erdgas-Museum Twist =

Oil and gas museum in Lower Saxony, Germany

Coordinates: 52°38′50″N 7°05′42″E

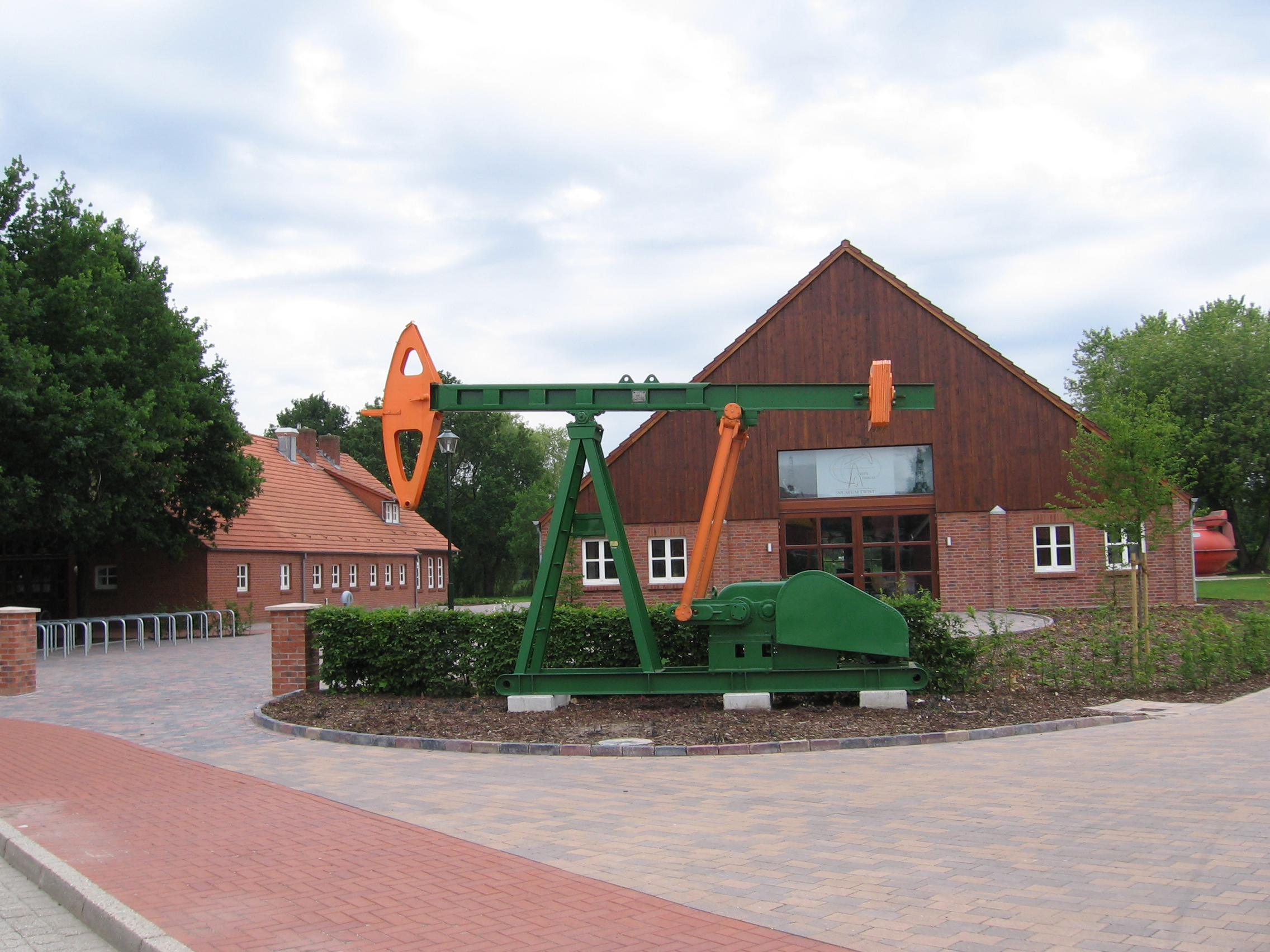
Erdöl-Erdgas-Museum Twist with a typical pumpjack that can be found in and around Twist

The Erdöl-Erdgas-Museum Twist in Twist, Germany is a museum for crude oil and natural gas and shows technical equipment for mineral exploration of these natural energy resources and gives information about their geological origin.

== History ==
In 1938 a gas rig found natural gas around the city of Bentheim. In early 1942 the rig LINGEN 2 found crude oil around the village of Dalum. These wells were the beginning of a long drilling history in the region. Later on the counties Emsland, Graftschaft Bentheim and the nearby Dutch province of Drenthe became one of the most important oil production areas for crude oil and natural gas in the whole of Europe.

Because of this long historical connection between the region and the oil production the idea came up off founding a technical museum that shows how the oil production worked and still works.

In 1999 the museum was established and is a part of the registered association Heimathaus Twist. In the beginning, the museum was located in the basement of the Heimathaus Twist building. The basement of the Heimathaus Twist was built as a bunker, therefore there was no way to get daylight into the museum and the illumination was not adequate for a public museum. In 2009, the museum moved into a new building directly beside the Heimathaus.

== Exhibition space ==
The exhibition space is about 450 m^{2} spread over two floors and in addition the museum also has an open-air exhibition ground for showing bigger exhibits related to crude oil and natural gas industry. The museum has a small library as well as a presentation room for lectures and showing movies and presentations. The whole museum is disabled accessible.

All information boards provide information in two languages, German and Dutch. Beside these information boards an audio tour is also available. A short one for about 40 minutes and a detailed one for about 2 hours. Also private guided tours are also available, but need to be booked in advanced.

The museum is certified with the seal of approval as a family-friendly museum. It allows the kids to check out the toys while the parents explore the exhibition.

In November 2011 the special exhibition "Aufgetaucht – Erdgas aus Russland" (Emerged - Natural Gas from Russia) presented the original pipes of the Nord-Stream-Pipeline. After the end of this special exhibition these pipes became part of the permanent exhibition. The pipes were provided by Nord Stream, the operating company of this pipeline. The Nord-Stream-Pipeline was a 7.4 bn € pipeline project finished in 2011. This double line pipeline transports natural gas from Russian Vyborg via the Baltic Sea to the German Lubmin. These pipes are presented in the outside section of the museum directly on a lakeside. Two pipes are on the south shore of this lake and two further pipes are on the north shore. The lake symbolizes the Baltic Sea with the Russian part on the one side and the German part on the other side. This pipe weighs one metric ton per meter, in addition undersea pipelines are encased in an additional one metric ton of concrete per meter to be fixed/placed on the sea bed.

== See also ==
- List of petroleum museums
