= Protestant Church, Borgholzhausen =

Church in Borgholzhausen, North Rhine-Westphalia, Germany

Coordinates: 52°6′9.4″N 8°18′7.6″E

Protestant Church
- Ev. Kirche
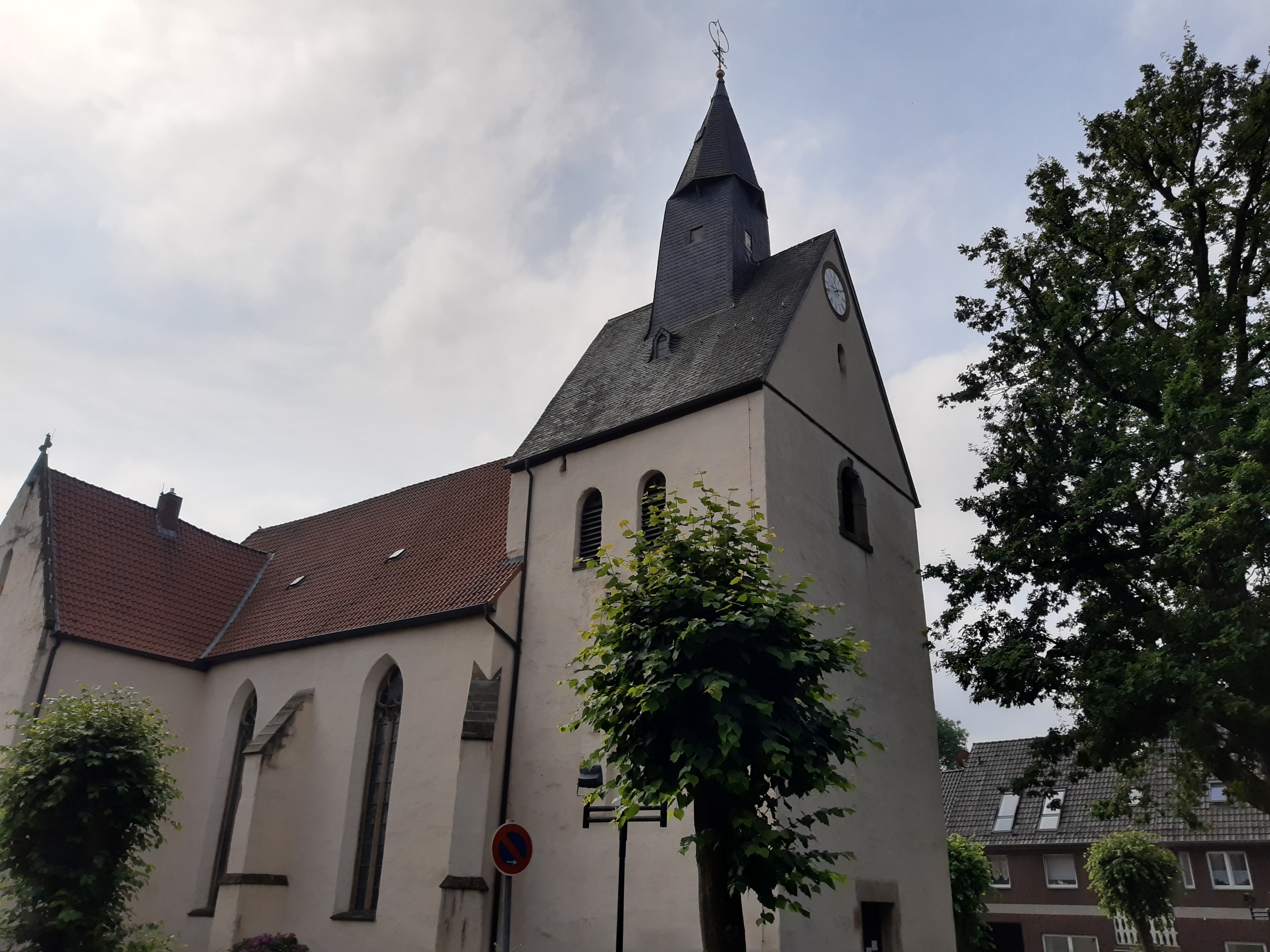
- Exterior in 2021
- Location: Borgholzhausen
- Denomination: Lutheran

History
- Status: Parish church

Administration
- Deanery: Evangelische Kirche von Westfalen

The Protestant Church (known in German as Evangelische Kirche or Ev. Kirche) in Borgholzhausen, North Rhine-Westphalia, Germany, is the church of the Lutheran parish there, which belongs to the Halle district of the Evangelische Kirche von Westfalen. The building dates back to the 14th century. It features a unique carved stone altarpiece from 1501.

== History ==
A church in Borgholzhausen was first mentioned in a 1169 document as a church (Eigenkirche) of the Counts of Ravensberg. The present church, replacing earlier structures, was built beginning in 1340. It was expanded by a Gothic choir in 1496. A carved stone altarpiece was added in 1501.

The church became Lutheran during the Reformation, with the reformer Johannes Sandhagen. He was born in 1492, and introduced the Reformation in Borgholzhausen in 1535, followed by more pastors from his family. Catholic services were permitted at the church until 1624.

The interior of the church was restored in 1955/56. In 1975/76, additions from the 19th century were removed, archeological excavations were performed, and ornamental decoration of the ceiling refreshed. The exterior, especially the plaster, was restored in 2010/11.

A monument in front of the church was erected in memory of soldiers who fell in the wars between 1864 and 1871.

Church and parish belong to the Kirchenkreis Halle of the Evangelische Kirche von Westfalen.

== Building ==
The church is a hall church in late-Gothic style with one aisle. The main feature is a carved stone altarpiece dated to 1501, aimed at the majority of the congregation that could not read. It is a unique work of art in Westphalia. It depicts the Passion of Jesus in 13 scenes.

== Gallery ==
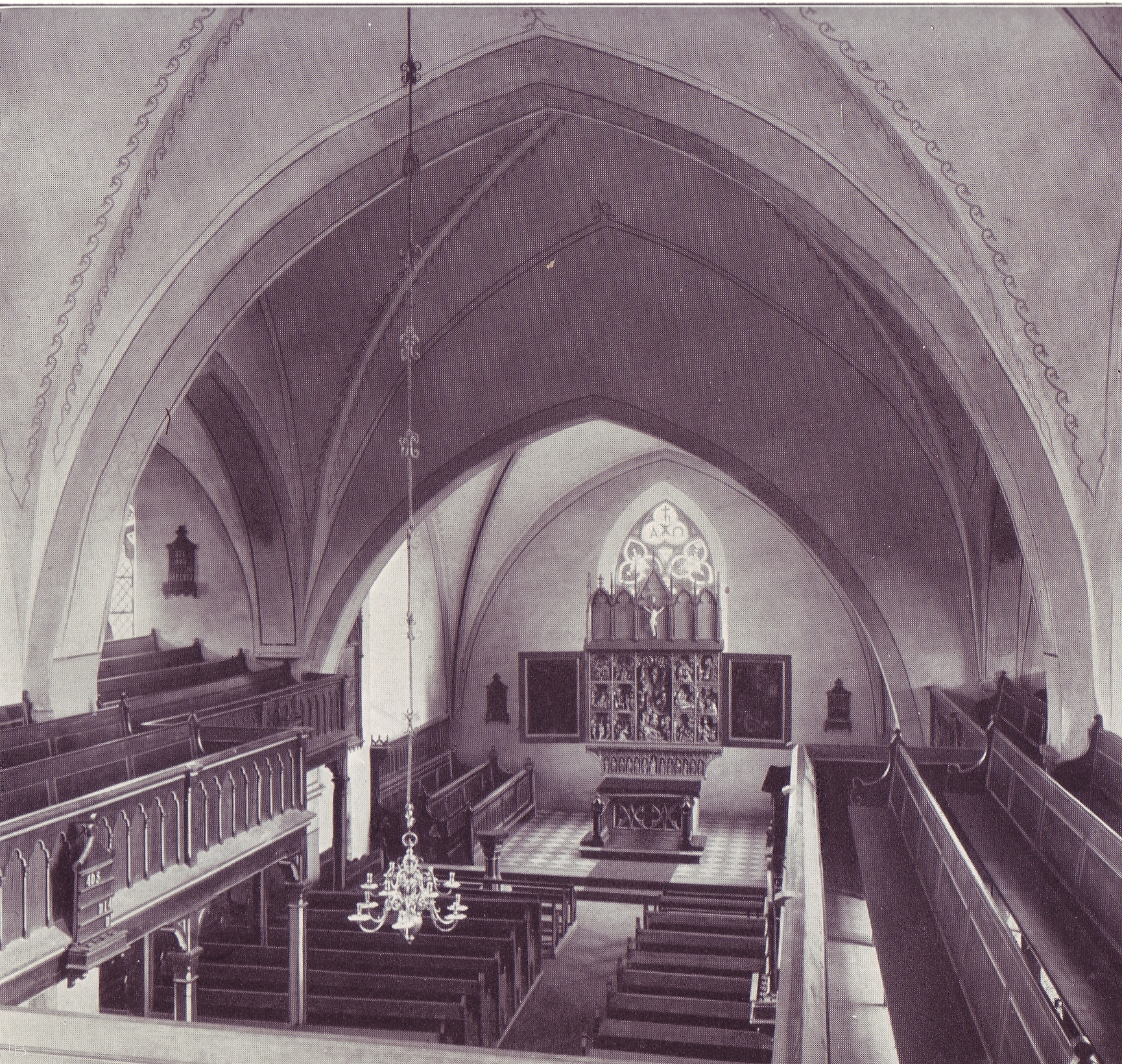
View to the choir in 1908

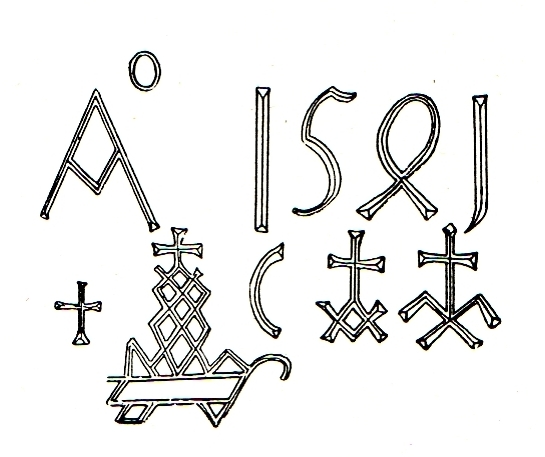
Signature of stonemasons, around 1500

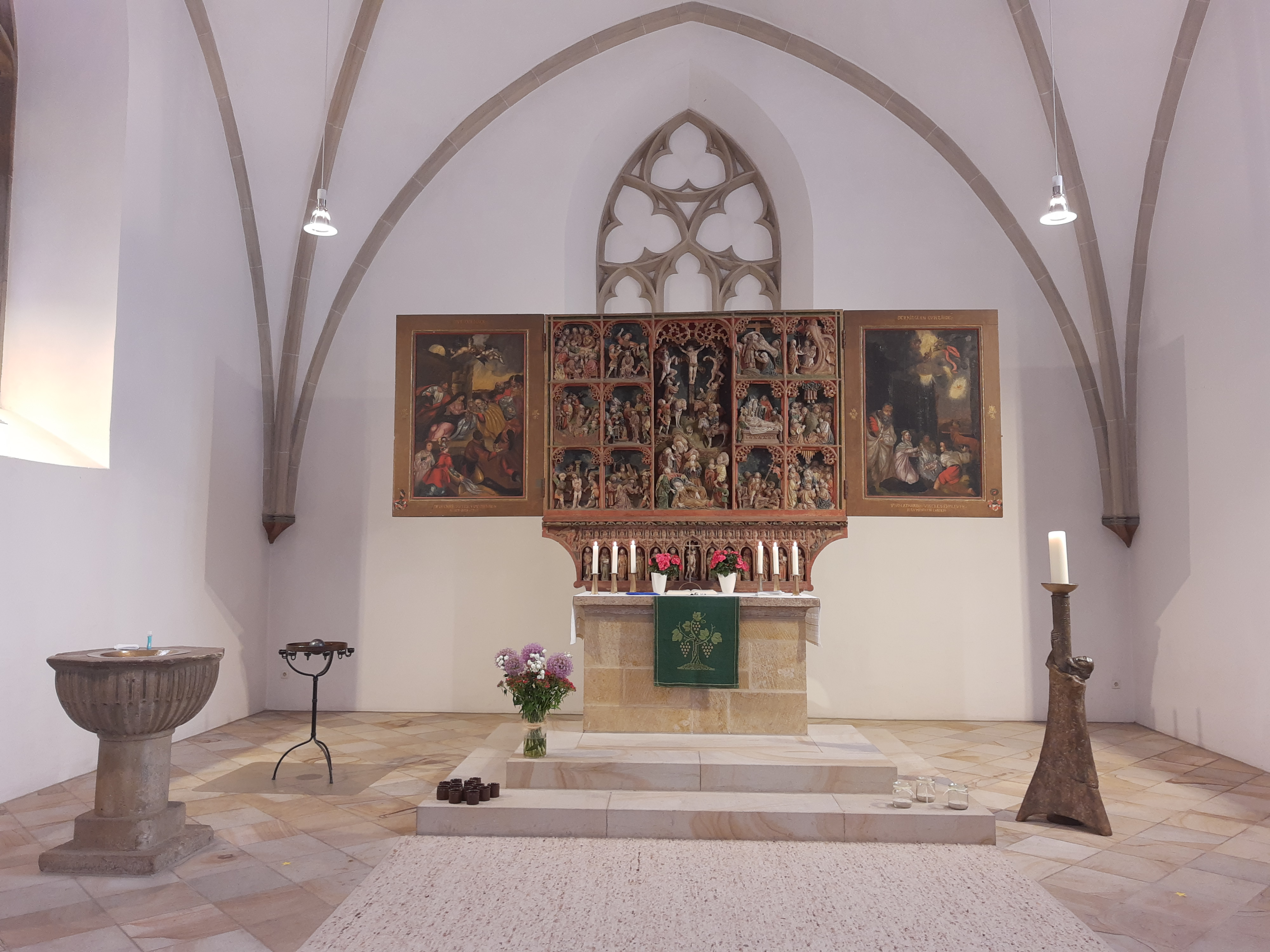
Altar area

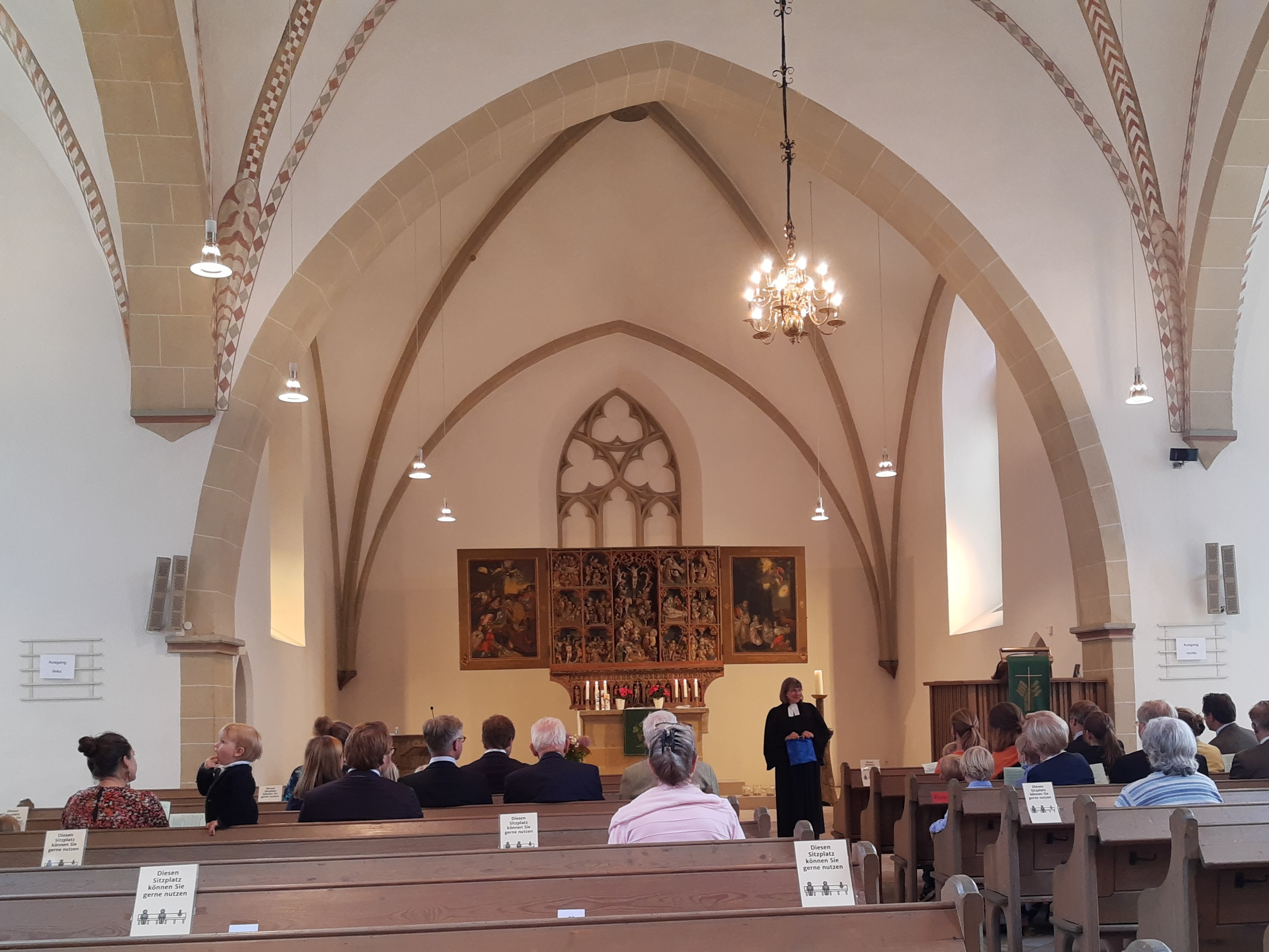
Baptism service on 11 July 2021
