= Rainer Spiering =

German politician

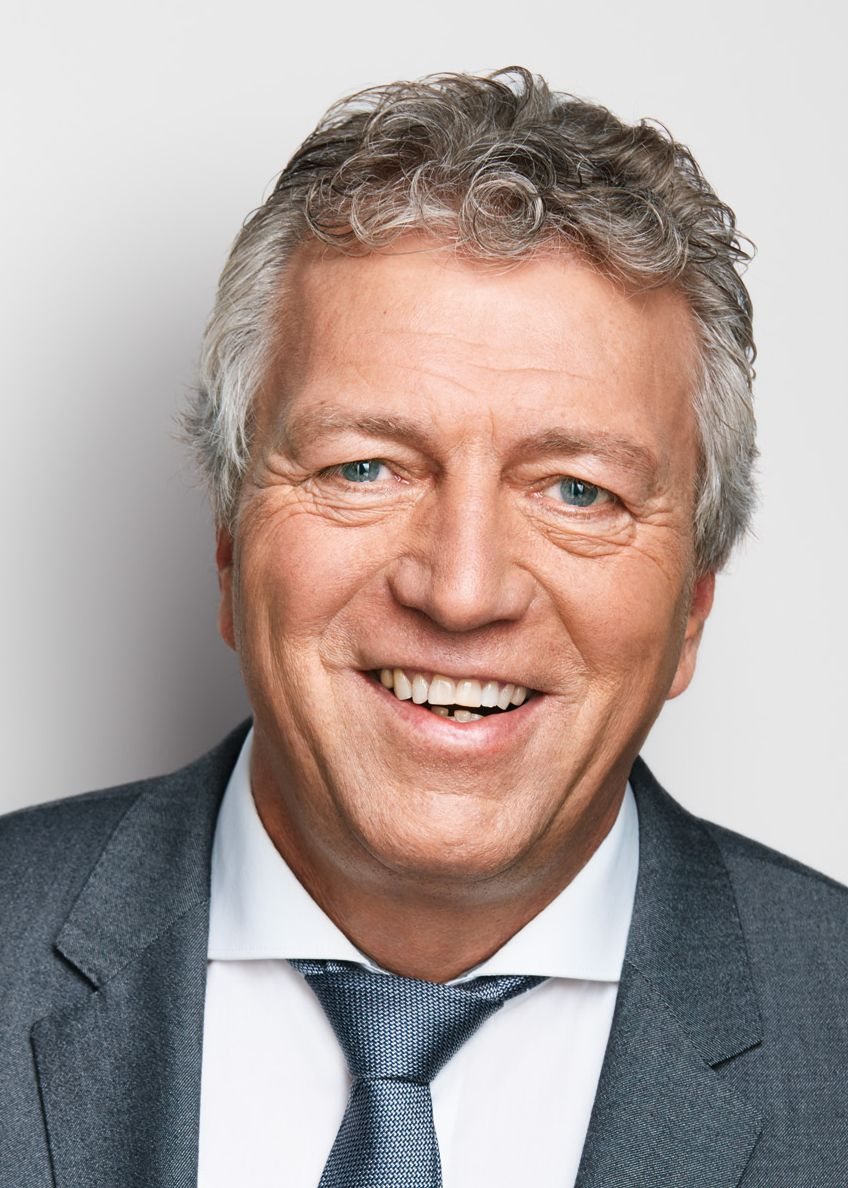
- Rainer Spiering in 2017

Member of the Bundestag
- In office 2013–2021

Personal details
- Born: 27 January 1956 (age 70) Dissen, Lower Saxony, West Germany (now Germany)
- Party: SPD

Rainer Spiering (born 27 January 1956) is a German politician. Born in Dissen, Lower Saxony, he represents the SPD. Rainer Spiering has served as a member of the Bundestag from the state of Lower Saxony from 2013 to October 2021.

== Life ==
He became member of the bundestag after the 2013 German federal election. He is a member of the Committee for Food and Agriculture. In June 2020, Spiering announced that he would not stand in the 2021 federal elections
