= Bundesautobahn 31 =

Federal motorway in Germany

A 31
- Bundesautobahn 31

Route information
- Part of E22
- Length: 240 km (150 mi)

Major junctions
- North end: North Sea near Emden
- South end: Ruhr area

Location
- Country: Germany
- States: Lower Saxony; North Rhine-Westphalia

Highway system
- Roads in Germany; Autobahns; List; Federal; List; State; E-roads
| ← A 30 | → A 33 |

Bundesautobahn 31 (translates from German as Federal Motorway 31, short form Autobahn 31, abbreviated as BAB 31 or A 31) is a German Autobahn that connects the coast of the North Sea near Emden to the Ruhr area. It is also known as Emsland-Autobahn or East Frisian Skewer.

It was completed in December 2004. Construction was in part made possible by a unique method of financing: individuals, companies, towns, counties and the Netherlands donated money to accelerate the project.

== Exit list ==
| (1) | Emden-West |
| | Larreter Tief |
| (2) | Pewsum |
| | Harswegbrück |
| (3) | Emden-Mitte |
| (4) | Emden-Wolthusen B 210 |
| | Ems-Jade-Kanal |
| (5) | Emden-Ost |
| (6) | Riepe |
| (7) | Neermoor |
| (8) | Veenhusen B 530 |
| (9) | Leer 3-way interchange A 28 E22 |
| (10) | Leer-Nord |
| (11) | Leer-West |
| | Tunnel Emstunnel 941 m |
| (12) | Jemgum |
| | Rest area Rheiderland |
| (13) | Weener B 436 |
| (14) | Bunde 3-way interchange A 280 E22 |
| (15) | Papenburg |
| | Services Raststätte Aschendorf |
| (16) | Rhede |
| (17) | Dörpen B 401 |
| | Rest area Ealchum/Dersum |
| (18) | Lathen |
| (19) | Haren B 408 |
| (20) | Wesuwe |
| (21) | Meppen-Nord B 402 E233 |
| (22) | Twist |
| (23) | Geeste |
| (24) | Wietmarschen |
| | Services Ems-Vechte |
| (25) | Lingen B 213 |
| | Ems-Vechte-Kanal |
| (26) | Emsbüren |
| (27) | Schüttorf 4-way interchange A 30 E30 |
| (28) | Schüttorf-Ost |
| | Bahnbrücke |
| | Vechte |
| (29) | Ochtrup-Nord |
| | Rest area Lau Brechte/Wester Mark |
| | Bahn-und Straßenbrücke |
| (30) | Gronau/Ochtrup B 54 |
| (31) | Heek B 70 |
| (32) | Legden B 474 |
| (33) | Gescher B 525 |
| | Services Hochmoor |
| (34) | Borken B 67 |
| (35) | Reken |
| (36) | Lembeck |
| | Grünbrücke |
| (37) | Schembeck B 58 |
| | Lippe Flutbrücke |
| | Lippe-und Wesel-Datteln-Kanalbrücke |
| (38) | Dorsten-West |
| (39) | Kirchhellen-Nord |
| | Bottrop-Feldhausen (planned) |
| (40) | Kirchhellen |
| (41) | Gladbeck |
| | Gladbeck-Ellinghorst (planned) |
| (42) | Bottrop 3-way interchange A 2 E34 |
