= Bad Rothenfelde =

- Municipality
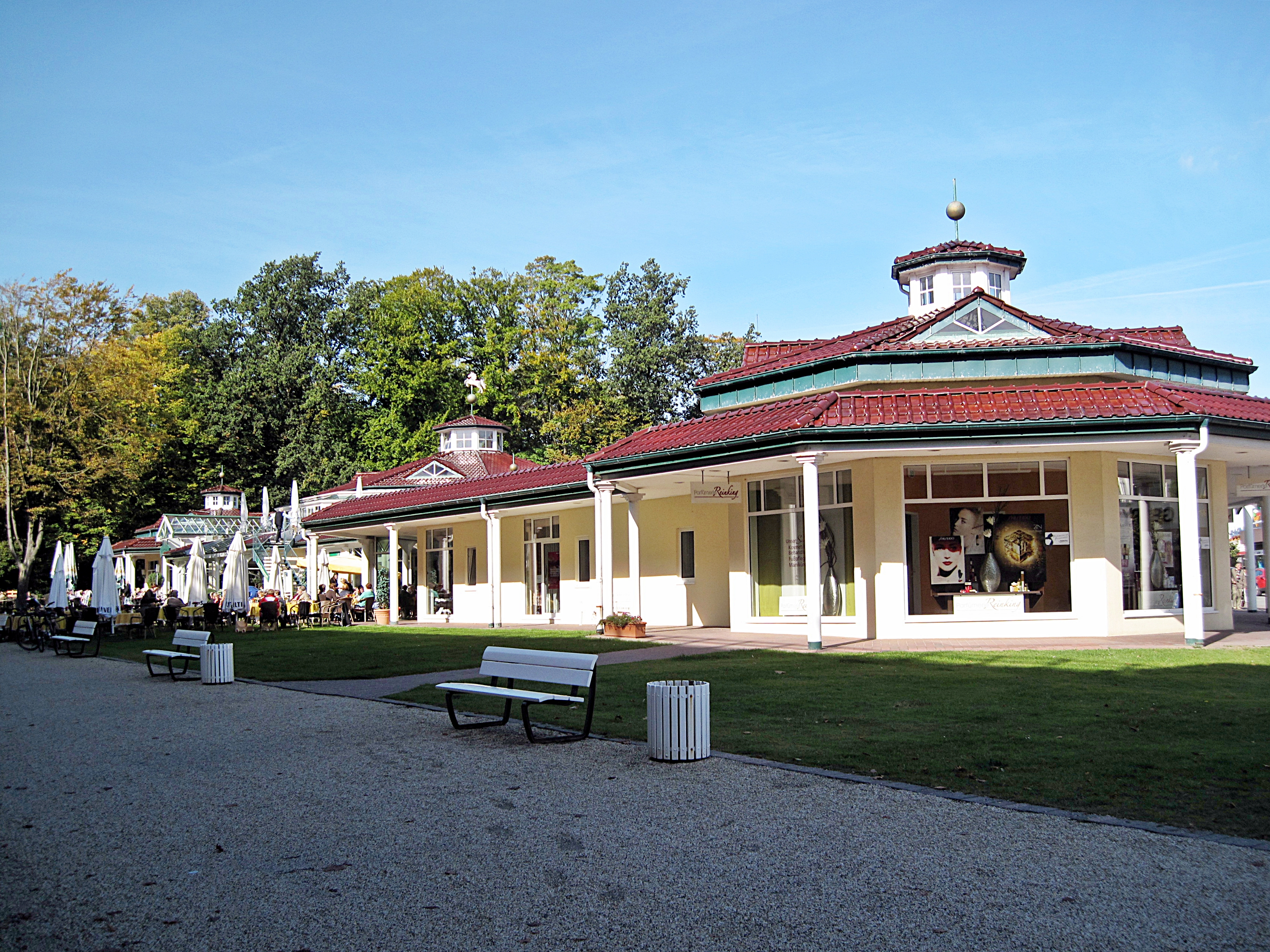
- „Galerie am Alten Gradierwerk“

- Coat of arms

- Location of Bad Rothenfelde within Osnabrück district
- Interactive map of Bad Rothenfelde
- Location within Germany Location within Lower Saxony
- Coordinates: 52°06′42″N 08°09′38″E
- Country: Germany
- State: Lower Saxony
- District: Osnabrück

Government
  - Mayor (2021–26): Klaus Rehkämper (CDU)

Area
  - Total: 18.22 km^{2} (7.03 sq mi)
- Elevation: 96 m (315 ft)

Population (2025-12-31)
  - Total: 8,249
  - Density: 452.7/km^{2} (1,173/sq mi)
- Time zone: UTC+01:00 (CET)
  - Summer (DST): UTC+02:00 (CEST)
- Postal codes: 49214
- Dialling codes: 05424
- Vehicle registration: OS, BSB, MEL, WTL
- Website: www.bad-rothenfelde.de

Bad Rothenfelde (German pronunciation: [baːt ˌʁoːtn̩ˈfɛldə]) is a municipality and health resort in the district of Osnabrück, in Lower Saxony, Germany.

It is situated in the Teutoburg Forest, approx. 20 km southeast of Osnabrück, between Hilter and Dissen.

Bad Rothenfelde has a spa, hospitals, clothes shops and many cafés.
