= Heimathaus Twist =

Cultural center in Germany

Coordinates: 52.6478°N 7.0939°E

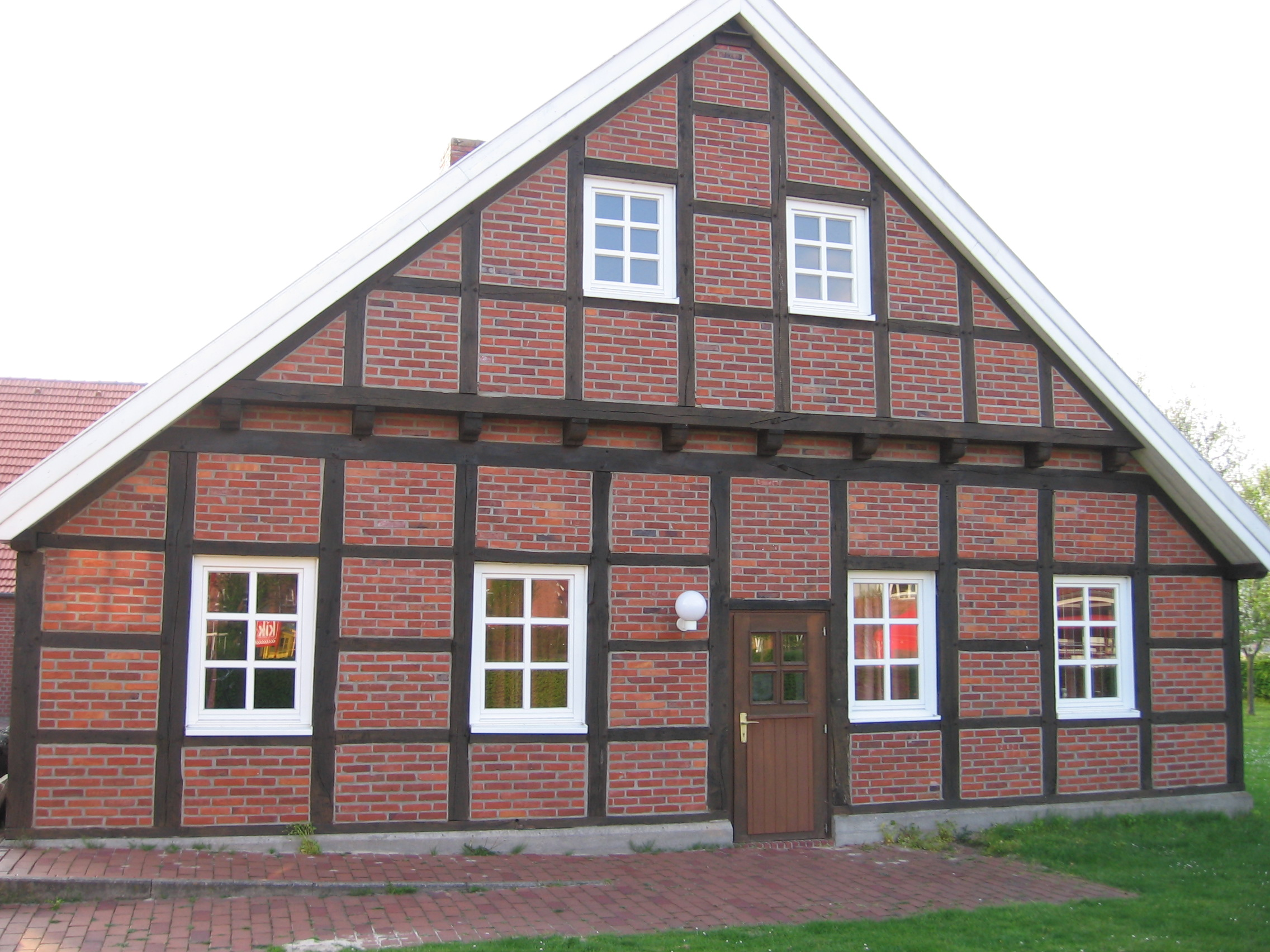
Heimathaus Twist - The Handwerker-Haus

The Heimathaus Twist is a cross-community cultural center in the municipality of Twist, Germany well known and for blues and folk music concerts nationwide.

== Building ==
The Heimathaus Twist is a complex of buildings and consists of four buildings in the traditional construction style of the Emsland county. The Handwerker-Haus (craftsman's house) is constructed in timber framing style and the second building is constructed as a brick building. Wooden beams from an old farm house were used from these houses. The timber-framed house and the wooden beams for the second building are from demolished farm houses in Heblermeer, a district in Twist, and were reconstructed in the center of Twist in 1980. The third build is a baking house that allows baking bread in a traditional way in a wood-fired oven. This house was constructed in 2003. In 2015 the Heimathaus Twist building was expended by another fourth building. This building is used for storage.

== Culture ==
Since 1990 regularly different events have taken place regularly in the Heimathaus Twist amongst others readings, classic music, folk and jazz. Especially because of its blues concerts the Heimathaus Twist has gained great popularity within the blues fan community. The good reputation and high number of gigs with well known bands and musicians for instance headliners like Albert Hammond and Maggie Reilly, Chris Farlowe , Ten Years After , John Lee Hooker Jr . or Hamburg Blues Band lead to the nickname „Blues-Mekka im Moor“ (Blues Mecca in the bog). Because of the nearby border to the Netherlands many Dutch people form a big part of the core audience, for important events even people from London or Nice come to the concerts.

At concerts in Heimathaus Twist several Live-CDs have been recorded amongst others the concert of the Blues Company , Ten Years After and the concert of Lefthand Freddy and the Aces . Often these gigs are also broadcast by nationwide radio stations like Deutschlandfunk and Deutschlandradio Kultur.

Furthermore, the Heimathaus team also organizes bicycle tours to explore and discover the region around Twist and organizes special events for entertaining children.
