= Bundesautobahn 30 =

Federal motorway in Germany

Coordinates: 52°14′39.97″N 8°05′33.32″E

A 30
- Bundesautobahn 30

Route information
- Length: 138 km (86 mi)

Major junctions
- West end: Dutch border
- East end: Bad Oeynhausen

Location
- Country: Germany
- States: North Rhine-Westphalia, Lower Saxony

Highway system
- Roads in Germany; Autobahns; List; Federal; List; State; E-roads
← A 29	→ A 31

Bundesautobahn 30 (translates from German as Federal Motorway 30, short form Autobahn 30, abbreviated as BAB 30 or A 30) is a highway in northwestern Germany. It runs from west to east, starting at the Dutch border. On the border it connects with the Dutch A1 motorway, hence, the A 30 is part of the important European connection Berlin – Amsterdam. It is an important connection from Hannover and Minden to Osnabrück, Münster and the Netherlands, and part of European Route E 30.

== Course ==
The A 30 starts as the continuation of the Dutch A1 motorway, at the Dutch border between Nordhorn and Bad Bentheim. In its course towards the east it first crosses Bundesautobahn 31 near Schüttorf, offering connections towards the Ruhr area (south) and Emden (north). It passes Rheine and near Osnabrück it crosses the A 1 and A 33, offering connections to the north in the direction of Bremen (A 1) and to the south in the direction of Münster (A 1) and Bielefeld (A 33).

About 50 kilometer farther to the east the A 30 ends in Bad Oeynhausen. Traffic continues over the Bundesstraße 61 through the health resort Bad Oeynhausen. After this town there is 1 additional kilometer of highway A 30, leading to the A 2. There the A 30 ends and continues as B 514.

== History ==
The first plans for an international motorway were made in 1933 with the Netherlands. The road was to run along Oldenzaal, Bad Bentheim, Salzbergen and Rheine. The 1938-1940 German road network plans contained a road that would run to the south of Salzbergen, north of Rheine and south of Osnabrück and would meet the A 2 near Herford and Bielefeld.

In earlier plans the A 30 would run along Bundesstraße 65 to Hannover. However, these plans were abandoned. Merely the bypass of Stadthagen and the southern bypass of Minden (part of the B 65) and parts of a planned interchange in Laatzen remain as evidence of these earlier plans. If the A 30 had been further extended through Minden and Stadthagen to Hannover, then today's segment of the A 30 around Bad Oeynhausen would have had the number A 339.

=== Bad Oeynhausen Bypass ===
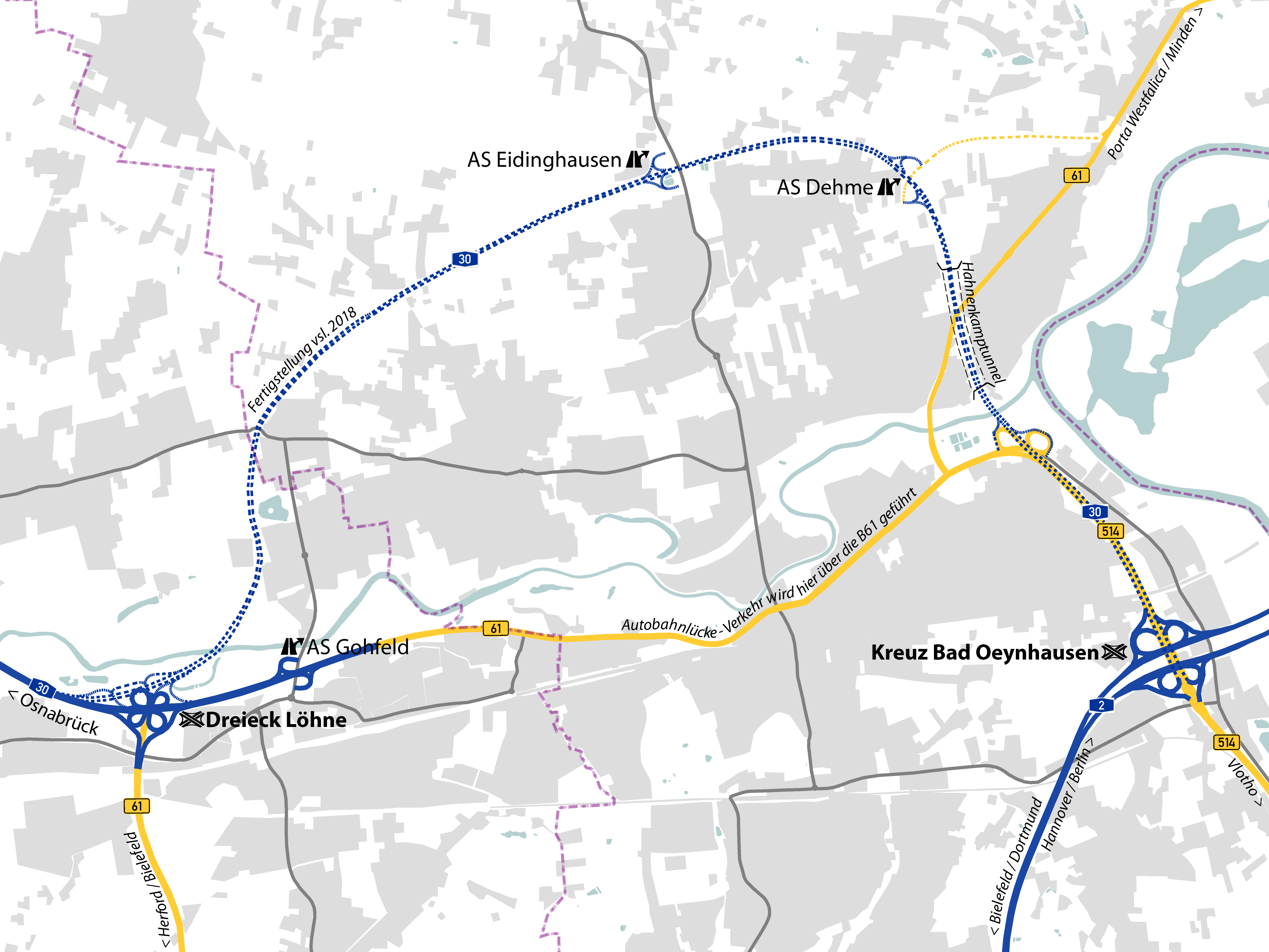
Planned routing of A30 in Bad Oeynhausen.

The closing of the highway gap near Bad Oeynhausen has been planned for decades, however, it has not been executed up to now due to disputes about the location of the planned northern bypass of Bad Oeynhausen. In the city there are frequent traffic jams, and traffic (especially freight traffic) is expected to increase. Hence, the gap closure towards the A 2 is judged especially urgent.

The government of the region Detmold has issued a planning decision for this last segment of the A 30 at the request of the North Rhine-Westphalian state company for road construction in January, 2007. The planned section is nearly 10 km long and the section should receive two new exits, 28 bridges and a tunnel. The citizens' group which exerts itself against the construction of the highway has submitted a complaint and an application for granting temporary legal protection against the planning decision before the Federal Administrative Court. In July 2008, the Court decided to reject the plaints against the planning decision.

Road construction began in autumn 2008. The section of A 30 bypassing around Bad Oeynhausen opened to traffic on 9 December 2018.
