= Borgholzhausen =

- Town
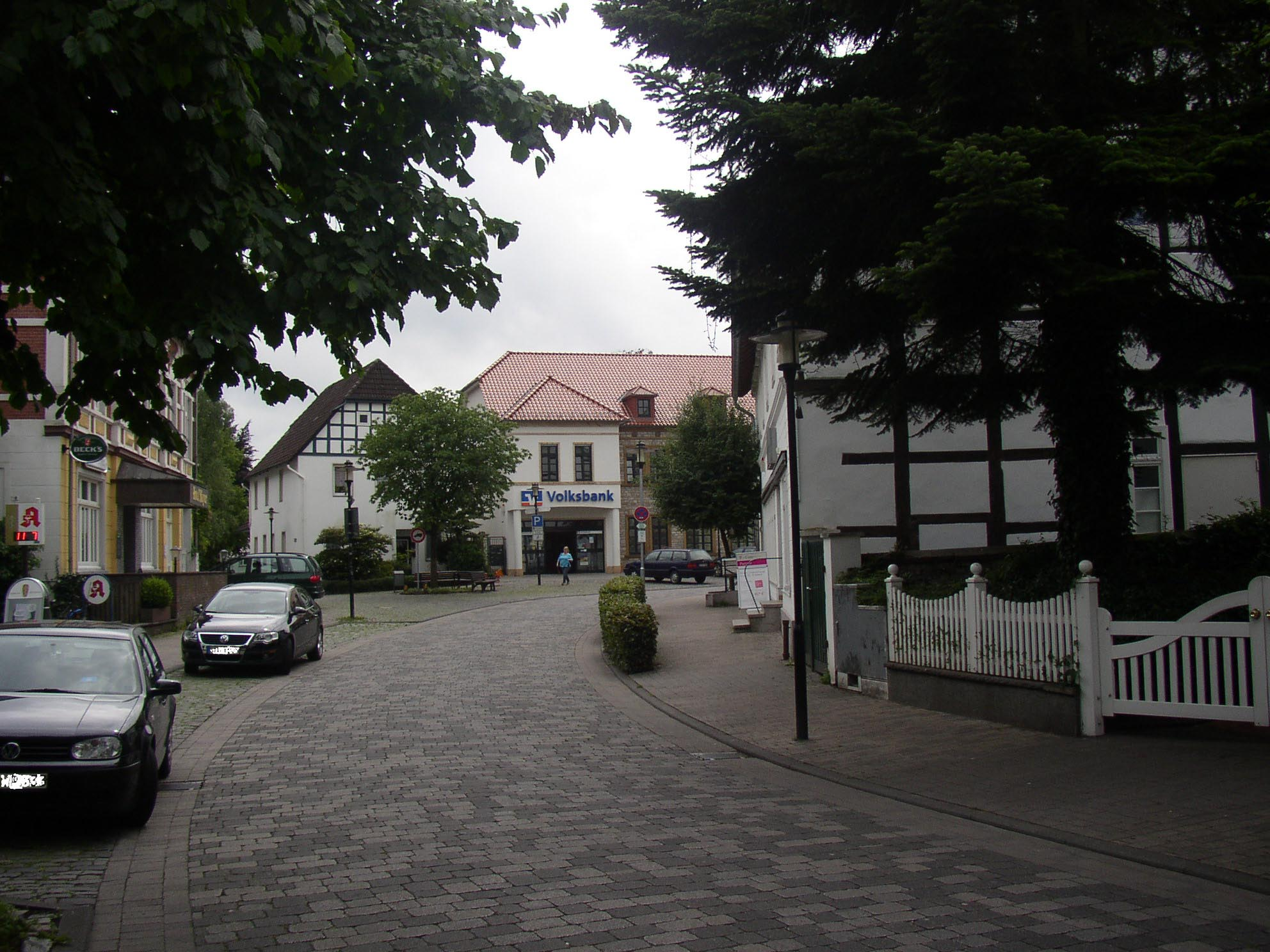
- Town centre of Borgholzhausen

- Flag Coat of arms

- Location of Borgholzhausen within Gütersloh district
- Interactive map of Borgholzhausen
- Location within Germany Location within North Rhine-Westphalia
- Coordinates: 52°06′00″N 08°18′00″E
- Country: Germany
- State: North Rhine-Westphalia
- Admin. region: Detmold
- District: Gütersloh
- Subdivisions: 12

Government
  - Mayor (2020–25): Dirk Speckmann (SPD)

Area
  - Total: 55.99 km^{2} (21.62 sq mi)
- Elevation: 80–306 m (262–1,004 ft)

Population (2025-12-31)
  - Total: 8,784
  - Density: 156.9/km^{2} (406.3/sq mi)
- Time zone: UTC+01:00 (CET)
  - Summer (DST): UTC+02:00 (CEST)
- Postal codes: 33829
- Dialling codes: 0 54 25
- Vehicle registration: GT
- Website: www.borgholzhausen.de

Borgholzhausen (German pronunciation: [bɔʁkhɔltsˈhaʊzn̩]) is a town in the district of Gütersloh in the state of North Rhine-Westphalia, Germany. It is located in the Teutoburg Forest, approx. 20 km north-west of Bielefeld.

Borgholzhausen is a sister city to New Haven, Missouri in the Missouri Rhineland of the United States.

== Geography and early history ==
Borgholzhausen is located in a clearing in the Teutoburg Forest, on the northern edge of the Westphalian Plain. The mountain range roughly bisects the city area NW-SE and is in turn bisected by the mountain pass where the town of Borgholzhausen was founded. The mountainous part of the Borgholzhausen area generally reaches elevations of 200–300 meters above sea level, while the pass area and other lower-lying parts are less than half that elevation.

The town center is about one kilometer east of the Johannisegge mountain and south of the Hankenüll mountain. The northern parts of Borgholzhausen are in the Ravensberger mountains, while the south is in the Münsterland. The bedrock in the former part is a thick layer mainly of Cretaceous sediments, while the latter has a less thick layer of generally Mesozoic rocks covering the trunk of a Paleozoic mountain range.

The Borgholzhausen pass was an important route for crossing the Teutoburg Forest in the Bronze Age. As early as 1,500 B.C. The pass area was populated across the board. Numerous Urnfield cemeteries have been excavated in and around the city.

== Town divisions ==
- Barnhausen
- Berghausen
- Borgholzhausen
- Casum
- Cleve
- Hamlingdorf
- Holtfeld
- Kleekamp
- Oldendorf
- Ostbarthausen
- Westbarthausen
- Wichlinghausen

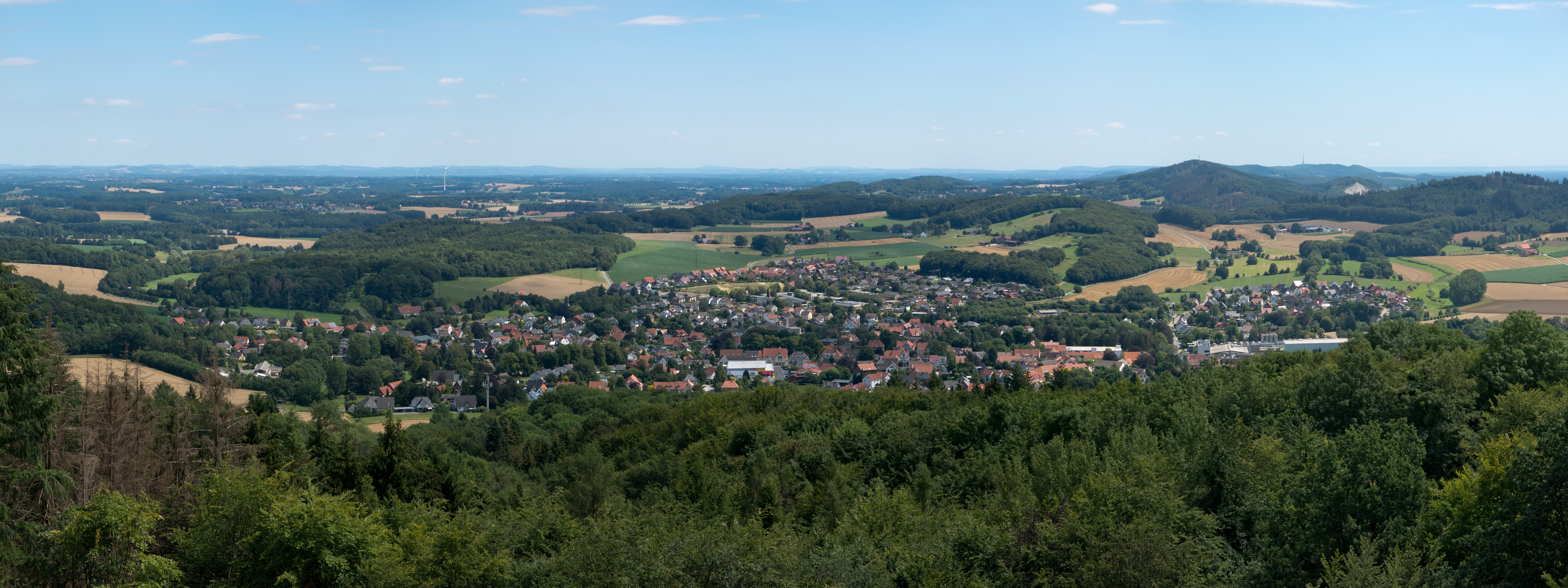
Borgholzhausen from Luis Tower

== Population ==
Historical population

Year	Pop.	±% p.a.
1965	7,577	—
1970	7,725	+0.39%
1975	7,463	−0.69%
1980	7,425	−0.10%
1985	7,453	+0.08%
1990	7,872	+1.10%
1995	8,463	+1.46%

Year	Pop.	±% p.a.
2000	8,676	+0.50%
2005	8,784	+0.25%
2010	8,620	−0.38%
2015	8,801	+0.42%
2020	8,964	+0.37%
2025	8,784	−0.40%

Source: Landesdatabank Nordrhein-Westfalen

== Church ==
The Protestant Church dates back to the 14th century and features a stone-carved altar from around 1500.
