= Hilter =

Place in Lower Saxony, Germany

Hilter am Teutoburger Wald
- Municipality
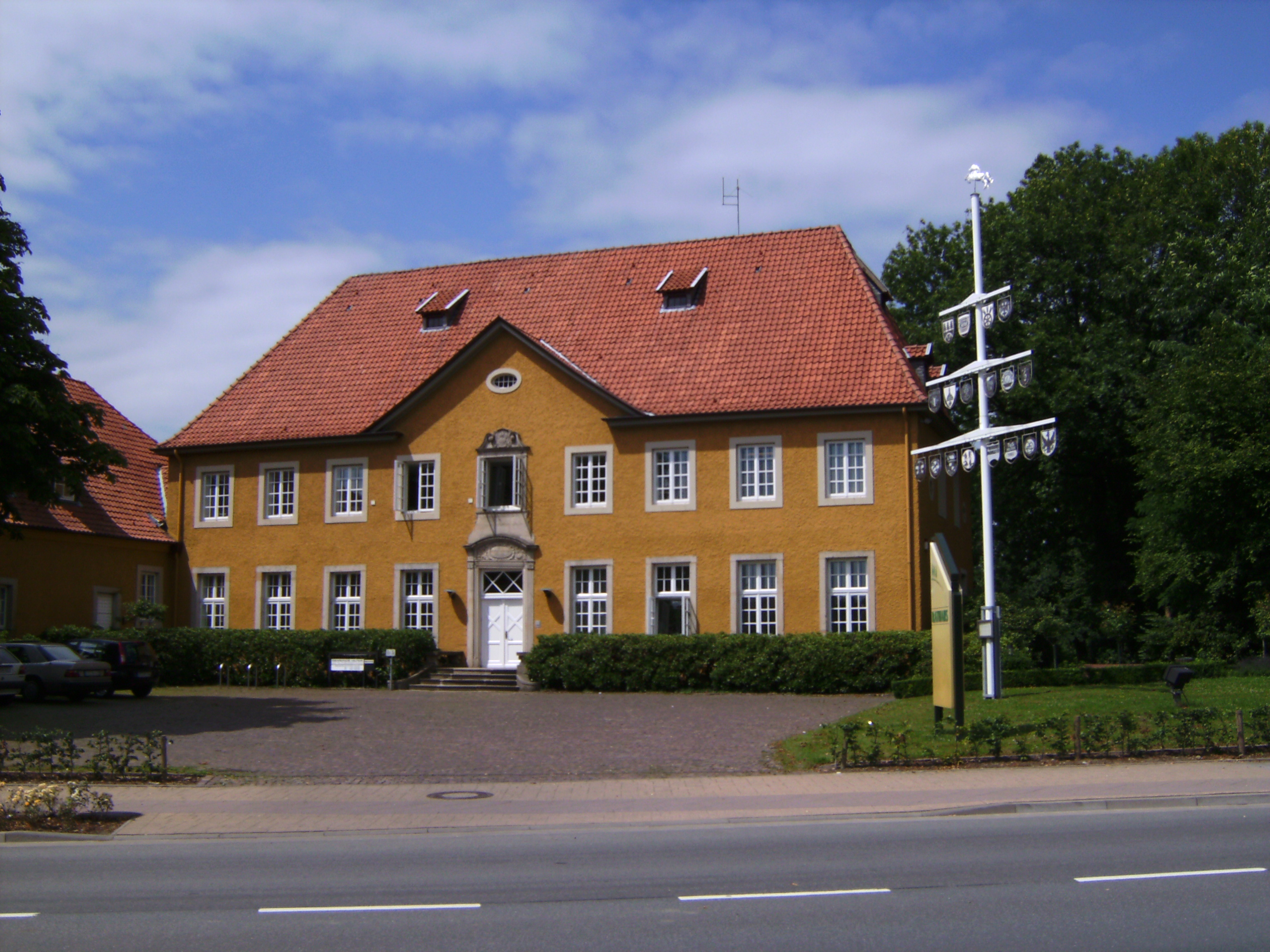
- Town hall

- Coat of arms

- Location of Hilter am Teutoburger Wald within Osnabrück district
- Interactive map of Hilter am Teutoburger Wald
- Location within Germany Location within Lower Saxony
- Coordinates: 52°9′N 8°9′E
- Country: Germany
- State: Lower Saxony
- District: Osnabrück
- Subdivisions: 8

Government
  - Mayor (2020–25): Marc Schewski (CDU)

Area
  - Total: 52.59 km^{2} (20.31 sq mi)
- Elevation: 198 m (650 ft)

Population (2025-12-31)
  - Total: 10,064
  - Density: 191.4/km^{2} (495.6/sq mi)
- Time zone: UTC+01:00 (CET)
  - Summer (DST): UTC+02:00 (CEST)
- Postal codes: 49176
- Dialling codes: 05424, 05409
- Vehicle registration: OS, BSB, MEL, WTL
- Website: www.hilter.de

Hilter am Teutoburger Wald (German pronunciation: [ˈhɪltɐ ʔam ˈtɔʏtoˌbʊʁɡɐ ˈvalt], lit. 'Hilter on the Teutoburg Forest') is a municipality in the district Osnabrück, Lower Saxony, Germany, in the hills of the Teutoburg Forest. As of 2020 it has a population of 10,429, and covers an area of 52.61 km^{2}. Its highest elevation is the Hohnangel, 262 metres above sea level.

== History ==
The municipality was united on 14 July 1972 by merging the municipalities Borgloh, Hankenberge and Hilter. Already in 1977 the municipalities Allendorf, Borgloh-Wellendorf, Ebbendorf, Eppendorf and Uphöfen were joined into the Einheitsgemeinde Borgloh.

== Industry ==
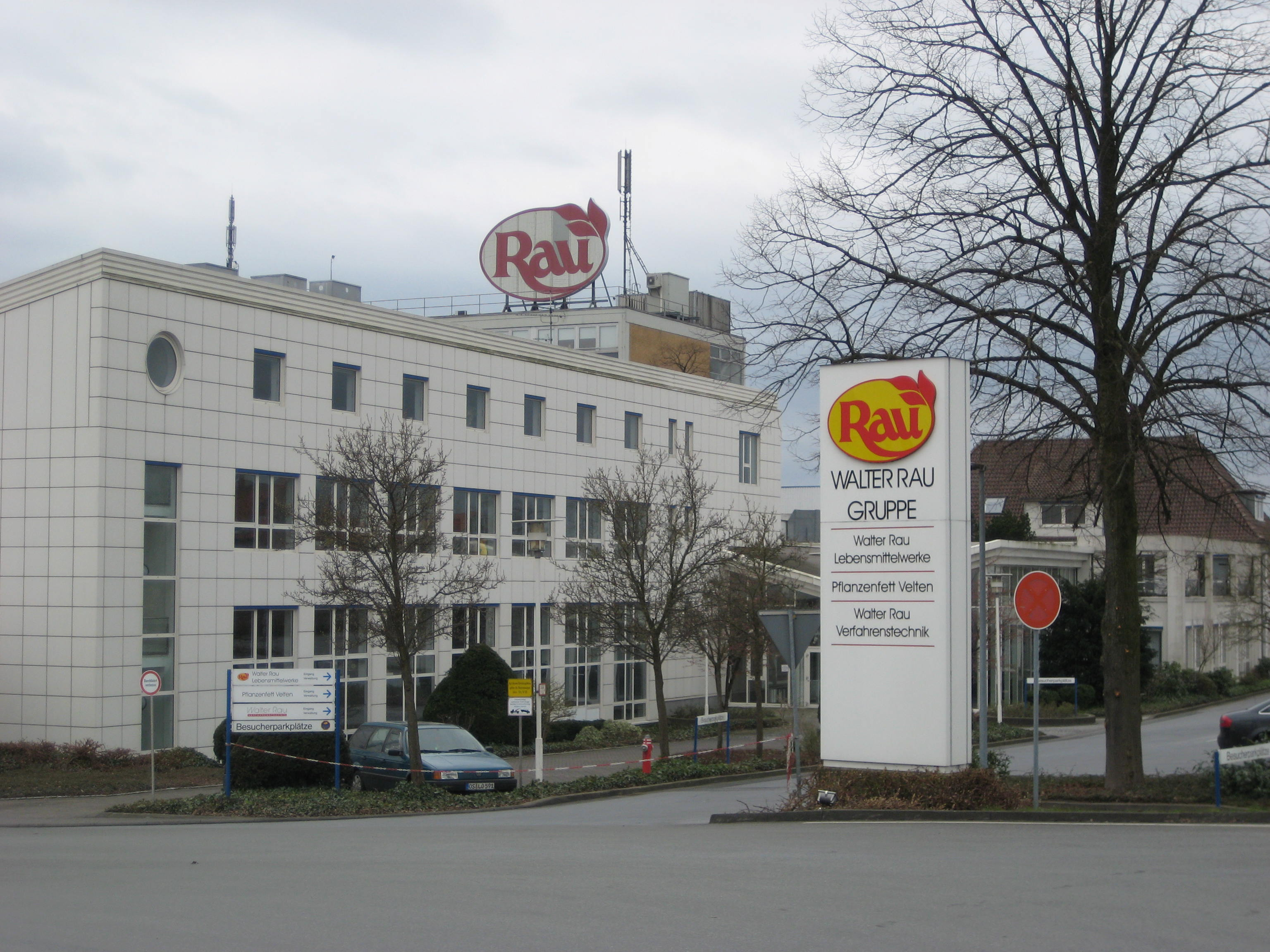
The margarine factory

Hilter was well known for mining Hilter Gold ochre as well as its big margarine factory which owned one of the largest whaling fleets in the early 20th century.

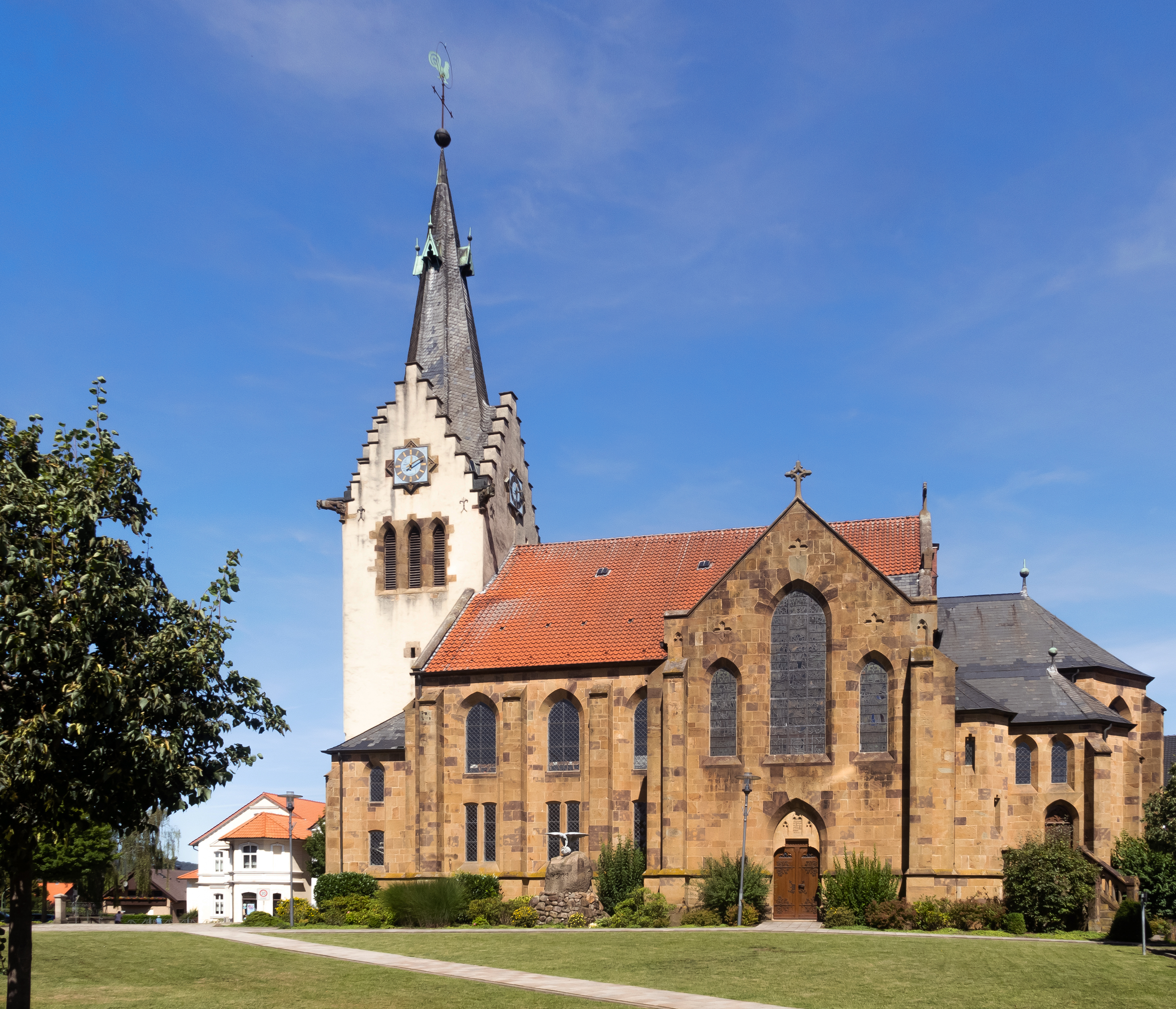
Hilter, church: Sankt Johannes der Täufer
