= Ingeborg Fülepp =

Croatian artist

- Ingeborg Fülepp at Harvard University, Cambridge 1988
- Born: Zagreb
- Known for: Media art, Video art, Installation art, Digital art, Electronic art, Film editing, Curator

Ingeborg Fülepp (born in Zagreb, Croatia) is a Croatian artist, university teacher, curator and film editor.

== Life ==
She studied film editing and film analysis at the Academy for Theatre, Film and Television at the University of Zagreb and later education, video and interactive media between others by prof. Carol Chomsky, and prof. Howard Gardner at Harvard University in Cambridge, (the USA) and with prof. Richard Leacock and prof. Glorianna Davenport at the Massachusetts Institute of Technology - MIT Media Lab in Boston (the USA).

== Work ==
She participated as a film editor in a number of Yugoslav films and TV serials and also in international co-productions. 1978 began her career as a university teacher first in Zagreb, then in London, Boston, Salzburg in the Netherlands, also in Germany at the Deutsche Film- und Fernsehakademie Berlin (DFFB, German Film and Television Academy Berlin), the "Konrad Wolf" University for film and television Potsdam-Babelsberg and the HTW Hochschule für Technik und Wirtschaft Berlin (German, University of Applied Sciences) in Berlin. Since 2013 she is appointed professor for media art and film/video editing at the Academy of Applied Arts at the University of Rijeka, Croatia.

Since 1990 she has worked together with her husband and partner Heiko Daxl under the name "mediainmotion" and "dafü®" in the fields of film, video art, visual music, CD-ROM, DVD, digital art, graphics, photo, installation and Mixed Media. Both established in Zagreb starting from 1993 and still during the war in Croatia the exhibition series Media Scape with international media art at the Museum for Contemporary Art in Zagreb (until 1999) and from 2005 - 2009 in the Galerija Rigo and Muzej Lapidarium in Novigrad (Cittánova) in the Croatian region of Istria. In 2010 and 2014 Media-Scape take a place again in Zagreb, and in 2014 in Rijeka, Croatia. From 2006 -2009 this manifestation was extended in co-operation with Noam Braslavsky under the title Strictly Berlin in the Galerie der Künste (GdK) in Berlin. Since 2013 professor for new media at the Academy of Applied Arts, University of Rijeka Since 2019 founder and leader of the Center for Innovetive Media, Academy of Applied Arts University of RIjeka

Fülepp lives and works in Rijeka, Berlin and Zagreb.
