= Heiko Daxl =

German artist (1957–2012)

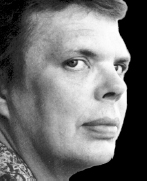
- Heiko Daxl
- Born: 21 September 1957; Oldenburg
- Died: 21 May 2012 (aged 54)
- Known for: Media Art, Video Art, Installation art, Digital Art, Electronic Art, Curator

Heiko Daxl (21 September 1957 – 21 May 2012) was a German media artist, exhibition curator, art gallery owner and design / art collector. Born in Oldenburg, Germany, he lived and worked in Berlin and Zagreb.

== Life ==
Until 1976 he grew up in Varel, Dangast and Neuenburg next to Jadebusen in the (Friesland (district)). During his education at the Lothar Meyer High-School he learned about the medium film. He first studied architecture and urbanism at Technische Universität Braunschweig (1978), but changed to the University of Osnabrück, which offered at that time in Germany a unique course of studies in communication and aesthetics. There he studied art history with Franz Joachim Verspohl, Walter Grasskamp, Lothar Knapp and Jutta Held as well as media studies with Joachim Paech, Werner Faulstich, Walter Fähnders, Peter von Rueden, Ingo Petzke and Wolfgang Becker,. Here he was conferred his Magister Artium degree in 1985. He also studied German Language and Literature at Technische Universität Berlin and Art History at the University of Zurich.

== Work ==
In 1980 he founded, with others under the guidance of Ingo Petzke, the Experimental Film Workshop Osnabrück, an annual festival for experimental film art, which in 1988 became the European Media Art Festival (EMAF). Daxl was till 1992 considerably involved in the shaping of this worldwide important forum for media art. From 1987 he has participated in Goethe-Institut cultural exchange programmes, visiting more than 50 countries in Europe, America, Asia and Australia.

Together with Evgenija Dimitrieva and Keiko Sei, in 1990 to 1991 he edited the tenth and last edition of the international video art magazine INFERMENTAL in Skopje and Osnabrück. He met his wife and partner Ingeborg Fülepp through a Goethe-Institut cultural exchange programme. In 1991 they established the exhibition series Media Scape of international media art, initially at the Mimara Museum and later at the Museum for Contemporary Art in Zagreb (until 1999) and the Galerija Rigo and Muzej Lapidarium in Novigrad, Istria (Cittánova), Istria, Croatia (from 2005). In 2006 this exhibition series was extended in co-operation with Noam Braslavsky under the title "Strictly Berlin" at the Galerie der Künste (GdK), Berlin.

Daxl and Fülepp have worked together since 1990 under the name "mediainmotion" and "dafü®" within film, video art, visual music, CD-ROM, DVD, digital art, graphics, photo, installation and Mixed Media. Through their teaching and involvement with the electroacoustic music department of the Akademie der Künste in Berlin (1995–2002) they have worked with contemporary composers such as Georg Katzer, Wolfgang Rihm, Milko Kelemen, Mona Mur, Jorge Reyes (musician), Steve Roach (musician), Amnon Wolman, Dror Feiler, Masami Akita (Merzbow), Zbigniew Karkowski, Elliott Sharp, Igor Kuljerić, Ivo Josipović and Ensemble Modern.

== Exhibitions ==
They have had work commissioned by Budge-Palais (Hamburg), Darmstädter Ferienkurse for New Music (Darmstadt), Musik der Jahrhunderte (Stuttgart), Donaueschinger Musiktage (Donaueschingen Festival for Contemporary classical music), Bayerische Staatsoper München, Lehmbruck-Museum Duisburg, Photokina Köln Toshiba Tokyo, Magyar Televízió Budapest, Südwestrundfunk Stuttgart, Music Biennale Zagreb, Prussian Cultural Heritage Foundation (Stiftung Preußischer Kulturbesitz Berlin), Berlin State Museums (Staatliche Museen zu Berlin), Neue Nationalgalerie Berlin, Goethe-Institut, INFERMENTAL, Budapest.
