= Zhang Kechun =

Chinese artist and photographer

Zhang Kechun (Chinese: 张克纯; born 1980 in Sichuan) is a Chinese artist and photographer. He is known for his photographs dwelling on the significance of the landscape in modern Chinese national identity. He currently lives and works in Chengdu, China.

== Biography ==
Zhang's first series The Yellow River documents the effects of modernisation along the third longest river in Asia. His second series, Between the Mountains and the Water, continued to explore the relationship between the people and land on which they live and work.

Zhang Kechun won the National Geographic Picks Global Prize in 2008, the Daylight Photo Award and the Arles Photo Festival Discovery Award in 2014. He was nominated by the Three Shadow Photo Award in 2012, Sony World Photography Awards in 2012 and 2013, and by the Prix HSBC Pour la Photographie in 2014.

His works have been collected internationally by many other museums and private collectors from the USA, France, Germany, Japan and China such as Chinese Image and Video Archive in Canada, Williams College Museum of Art, USA and the China Central Academy of Fine Arts.

== Exhibitions ==
2020:

- BredaPhoto, The best of Times the worst of times

2016:

- The Yellow River, Landskrona, Sweden
- Between the Mountains and Water, La Galerie, Hong-Kong
- Art Souterrain, Montréal, Québec

2015:The Yellow River, La Galerie, Hong-Kong
2014 : Les Rencontres d'Arles, Arles, France
2013 :

- The 4th edition of Photoquai world photography biennale, Musée du Quai Branly, Paris, France
- The 6th L'Iris d'Or Award Exhibition, Somerset House, London, UK
- Collection Exhibition, 1st Beijing Photo Biennial, China Millennium Monument, Beijing, China
- Delhi International Photography Festival, Delhi, India
- The 5th Dali International Photography Biennale, Dali, China
- The 6th Look 3 Festival of the Photograph, Charlottesville, USA
- The 3rd Chengdu Multi-dimensional View Photo Exhibition, Fanmate Art Museum, Chengdu, China
- Remote Places, Close Spaces, Street Level Photoworks, Glasgow, United Kingdom
- The 1st Future Master Exhibition, Winshare Art Museum, Chengdu, China

2012:

- Get It Louder, Sanlitun Village, Beijing, China
- The Interactions Yixian International Photo Festival, Yixia, China
- The 8th Angkor Photography Festival, Siem Reap, Cambodia
- There there Photographic Exhibition, Cork City, Ireland
- The 4th Jinan International Photography Biennale, Jinan, China
- Future Exhibition, China Central Academy of Fine Arts Museum, Beijing, China
- The 2013 Three Shadows Photography Award Exhibition, Three Shadows Photography Art Centre, Beijing, China

2010

- Right In Front of Your Eyes, Chengdu International Photography Center, Chengdu, China
- Southern Documentary Photography Exhibition, Guangdong, China

== Awards ==
- National Geographic Picks Global Contest (2008)
- Sony World Photography Awards, shortlisted (2013)
- Discovery Award at Les Rencontres d'Arles for The Yellow River (2014)

== Collections ==
- Chinese Image and Video Archive, Canada
- Williams College Museum of Art, USA
- China Central Academy of Fine Arts, China
