= Walter Heise =

German music educator and musicologist

Walter Heise (28 August 1931 – 3 January 2017 was a German music educator and musicologist.

== Life ==
Born in Obernbeck, Heise studied in Osnabrück (among others with Kurt Sydow, Berlin (among others with Boris Blacher, Karl Heinz Taubert, Günther Baum), London and Münster and received the Stresemann Scholarship of 15,000 DM from the Senate of Berlin, which enabled him to spend a year researching in England. After his studies, he first worked as a teacher at primary schools and as an assistant and lecturer at various universities. From 1974 until his emeritus in 1998, Heise taught music education at Osnabrück University. In addition to comparative work on music education writings of the GDR, a special focus was his work on historical music education and John Gay's The Beggar's Opera and its adaptations, as well as the research focus "Music and New Technologies" in teacher training.

In 1986, Heise was awarded the Honorary Fellowship of the Curwen Institute in London.

Heise died in Belm at the age of 86.

== Publications ==
Heise published numerous papers on teaching practice as well as contributions to the history and systematics of music education in handbooks and journals. The musicologist is one of the co-founders and editors of the Zeitschrift für Musikpädagogik (ZfMP) and the Lexikon der Musikpädagogik (1972/1984). Heise is also editor of the Quellentexte für Musikpädagogik.
