= Media Scape =

Media Scape is a set of meetings with exhibitions, film/video programs and symposia of international artists in the context of media art.

== History ==
Media Scape was founded in May 1991 by Heiko Daxl, Ingeborg Fülepp, Bojan Baletic and Malcolm Le Grice in Zagreb (Croatia).

From 1991 to 1999 Media Scape took place annually in the Mimara Museum, in the MultimediaCentar, in the HDLU (Hrvatsko drustvo likovnih umjetnika - Croatian Association of Fine Arts) and in the Museum of Contemporary Art in Zagreb. Within this time frame around 300 artists from more than 30 countries participated.

In the year 2005 Media Scape moved into the Galerija Rigo/Museum Lapidarium in the city of Novigrad, Istria (Cittánova), led by Jerica Ziherl, in the Croatian region of Istria. Since 2006 in co-operation with Noam Braslavsky the Galerie der Künste (GdK) in Berlin, became an additional venue under the title "Strictly Berlin". In 2010 Media Scape came back to Zagreb under the title "The Year We Make Contact" and will continue in 2013 as the MSBZ "Media Scape Biennale Zagreb" for Contemporary Time Based Art.
