= Ingo Petzke =

German film director

Ingo Petzke (born 18 September 1947 in Belm near Osnabrück in Germany) is an internationally acknowledged German film scholar, filmmaker and author. Ingo Petzke grew up in Osnabrück. He attended the Münster and Bochum universities and received his master's degree in 1973 (journalism, Scandinavian studies, modern history).

Petzke started his professional career in 1976 in Bad Oeynhausen as one of Germany's youngest directors of an adult education school but fell more and more to the lure of film. For several years he worked in the Festivalkommission of Internationale Kurzfilmtage Oberhausen and together with his students (Heiko Daxl and others) started the Osnabrück Experimentalfilm Workshop in 1980 which since 1988 is known as European Media Art Festival.

In 1974 he was adjunct lecturer for film at Ruhr Universität Bochum and between 1978 and 1983 at Universität Osnabrück. Since then he lectured in 31 countries, among them New Zealand, Hong Kong, Chile, Argentina, the United States and Canada. In 1986 the Philippine government awarded him for "International Contribution to Philippine Independent Cinema".

His (experimental) shorts screened at numerous domestic and foreign festivals. From 1976 to 2000 his company CINE PRO acted as sole German distributor specialised in avant-garde/experimental film. During the 1980s Petzke was a member of the Film Commission of Goethe-Institut – German Culture Institute, for which he curated several packages of experimental films and shorts. Since 2007, he runs Red Avocado Film, a DVD edition dedicated entirely to experimental film.

Since 1983 Petzke has been Professor for Film at the Design Faculty of the University of Applied Sciences Würzburg-Schweinfurt. He lived and worked several turns in Australia: 1992 as a visiting professor at Queensland University of Technology in Brisbane and 2001–2006 as an associate professor at Bond University on the Gold Coast. In 2004 he earned his "PhD by Published Works" about experimental film. Additionally, he was awarded a Dr. phil. degree in 2006 at Universität Osnabrück with a film historical dissertation about Hollywood-based Australian feature film director Phillip Noyce. In 2008 he was appointed Adjunct Professor at the James Cook University's School of Creative Arts and in 2009 appointed Honorary Fellow of the Cairns Institute (For Research in the Tropics), both in Far-North Queensland, Australia.

His main areas of interest are the history of the international Avant-garde (from 2008 till 2011, he was also Director of the (German) Research Center for Experimental Film) and more recently Australian film. Also, he has frequently done research into curriculum development, particularly for the German federal government.

Petzke is a member of the German Film Critics Association (VdFk) and of Screen Producers Association of Australia (SPAA).

== Works ==
=== Books ===
- 1989 Das Experimentalfilm Handbuch, Frankfurt am Main
- 1998 Unternehmen im Internet: Web Seiten gestalten, München
- 2001 Das grosse Buch Adobe Premiere 6, Düsseldorf
- 2004 Backroads to Hollywood – Phillip Noyce, Sydney
- 2007 24 Frames – The Cinema of Australia and New Zealand, London (chapter)
- 2007 Kino Sine – Philippine-German Cinema Relations, Manila (chapter)

=== Films ===
- 1975 Glimtar, 17 mins
- 1976 Asymptote, 11 mins
- 1977 Albedo 0.97, 13 mins
- 1980 Jesper, 11 mins
- 1984 Hong Kong Topography – Approaches, 13 mins
