= Ken Kitano =

Japanese photographer (born 1968)

Kitano Ken (北野謙; born 1968) is a Japanese photographer who graduated from Nihon University's College of Industrial Technology. Kitano has held solo exhibitions and participated in various group exhibitions domestically in Japan and internationally in countries such as Belgium, China, France, Germany, Sweden, Taiwan, and the United States. In 2004, he won the Society of Photography Award, and in 2007, he won the Newcomer's Award from the Photographic Society of Japan. He was an artist-in-residence at the Three Shadows Photography Art Centre in Beijing, China, in 2010. In 2012, he spent one year in Los Angeles, California, on the Overseas Study Program for Emerging Artists which was overseen by the Japanese Agency for Cultural Affairs.

Kitano has also published numerous photography books, such as our face: Asia and FLOW AND FUSION. He has also collaborated on other books such as Witness #2, with Moriyama Daido, and Photography? End? Seven Visions – New Photographic Experiences.

== Flow and Fusion ==
This was Kitano's first project, a series of cityscapes taken predominantly throughout Tokyo near the end of the Japanese economic boom, which ended around 1992. Kitano utilized a slow shutter technique, which captures the movement of people or vehicles in a dematerialized and amorphous cloud-like entity. He was fascinated by the dematerialization of the human subjects that appeared as clouds in his images and felt he was "analyzing the world on a molecular level." Katsuya Ishida, gallery director of MEM in Tokyo, explains that the dematerialization captured through the clouds of human movement latent with the energy and dynamism of the roaring Japanese economy made Kitano feel connected "with everyone in the universe as a whole."

Ishida explains that after the end of the Japanese economic miracle in 1991, Japan was beset by several disasters compounded by economic stagnation. After the Great Hanshin Earthquake and the sarin gas attacks on the Tokyo subway, Kitano lost his artistic initiative and stopped producing works. During this time, Kitano traveled several times to Mexico, where he was exposed to the large-scale mural paintings by artists such as Diego Rivera and Jose Clemente Orozco that depicted a multitude of people which Kitano lists "figures from the pre-Columbian era, invaders, rapists, living sacrifices, despots, resistance fighters, children, clergymen, prostitutes, con-artists, merchants, farmers,… coexisting in one image." These murals inspired him to take portraits, which he then superimposed on top of one another to create composite portraits of people from "different races, countries, classes, occupations and religions around the world." Ishida says that the throughline between the Flow and Fusion series and his later Our Face series is the blurring of individuality, which finds itself as "part of the larger entity of the passage of time" in which he "(explores) the state of human existence in relation to individuality."

== Our Face ==
Kitano traveled to various locations throughout Asia and photographed people in different localities, such as Istanbul, Turkey; Xinjiang, China; Taipei, Taiwan; Mae Hong Son, Thailand; Dhaka, Bangladesh; and Kermanshah, Iran. He then developed those portraits from specific localities into a single image.

Photography Critic, Yu Hidaka, uses the concept of Mille Plateau, a thousand plateaus, to describe the Our Face series. The thousand plateaus are "formed by the continuous configuration of… differences with no single apex or hierarchy," and the concept was developed by the American anthropologist Gregory Bateson. In each image of the Our Face series, individuals, or differences, are superimposed with equal exposure time onto a single image or a Mille Plateau. Hidaka argues that these composite images function to flatten or loosen relationships, such as those between religion, gender, and socio-economic statuses.

While photographic portraits have often been used as representations of the individuality of subjectivity, Ayelet Zohar explains that Japanese photographers such as Ken Kitano, Tomoko Sawada, Yasumasa Morimura, and Cozue Takagi have utilized the photographic portrait to address issues of "fictionality and performativity… using strategies of mimicry, masquerade, camouflage, disguise, multiplicity, juxtaposition, and repetition." She states that Kitano's Our Face series addresses issues of "layering and memory," where through the superimposition of portraits of people, the works arrive "at the erasure of individual identity." For Zohar, Kitano's singular images conceal individuals "under the mask of a unified portrait, where hidden layers stay secretive, like the layers of an archeological site, or of the unconscious." These metaphors of archeology and the unconscious allow Zohar to analyze Kitano's work in the context of Derrida's analysis of Freud's writing "mystic writing pad," which "preserves traces of past occurrences." Derrida goes one step further than Freud's concept and argues that systems of language and images contain "traces… that pre-figure language, meaning, and signification." Kitano's Our Face series engages in Derrida's investigation of the concept of "trace." By layering the individuality of his subjects, Kitano grasps at the traces of a deeper history tahat pre-figures any individual subjective identities that his subjects may have.

Zohar also compares Kitano's work to the 19th-century genetic research of Sir Francis Galton, who tried to develop a system for categorizing ethnicity through facial features. She mentions that Nancy Burson created similar layered portraits that used computer imaging in the 1980s that were critical of 19th century notions of eugenics proposed by researchers like Galton but Zohar argues that Kitano's work is not subversive like Burson's. In Zohar's analysis Kitano's works exist between these Galton's classification and Burson's criticism, as "evidence of the crowd we have become, and the lost value of the personal portrait in the world flooded by endless visual information."

== Long Exposure ==
Kitano's One Day series are long exposure photographs that capture the trajectory of the sun over one day; the resulting images are landscapes and cityscapes with a streak of white going through the sky. Kitano invokes collective memory in his deliberate choice of locations in places like "ground zeroes of bomb blasts, islands of convalescence for leprosy patients, and old battlegrounds in Okinawa." In an essay for the series, Kitano compared his project to Monet's endeavor to capture the changing light of the Rouen Cathedral.

While Kitano's One Day series tracks the movement of the sun over the course of a single day, Kitano's Gathering Light series captures the movement of the sun through long exposure over the course of six months. The streaks of light in the works are captured by a camera that is left in various locations for six months. The resulting images are landscapes and cityscapes with zebra-like stripes across the sky where the sun's movements have been recorded over time. The angle of the streaks of light, which are records of the sun's movement across the sky, in the photographs indicate the latitude and longitude of the position of the camera. Because the camera is left over the course of six months, the sun is obstructed by rain clouds, so the resulting image is also a sort of meteorological record.

== Permanent Collections ==
Kitano's works are included in various public collections such as the National Museum of Modern Art, Tokyo; Aichi Prefectural Museum of Art; Tokyo Photographic Art Museum; The National Museum of Art, Osaka; and The Museum of Modern Art Saitama; J. Paul Getty Museum; and San Francisco Museum of Modern Art.
