= Infermental =

Infermental was a magazine published solely on videocassettes. The concept was conceived the Hungarian filmmaker Gábor Bódy in 1980. The name is a combination of the words "international", "ferment", and "experimental".

== History ==
The eleven volumes of Infermental were published from 1980 to 1991 with a rotating series of editors from different countries. Each annual issue assembled from four to seven hours of the audio-visual work that represented the latest national trends of each country.

Infermental's ten issues (and one special) totaled approximately seventy hours of material from more than a thousand artists and thirty six countries. Among the numerous participating artists were Gary Hill, Rafael Montañez Ortiz, Jon Jost, Peter Weibel, Heiko Daxl, Marina Grzinic, Aina Smid, Joan Jonas, Yello, Ulrike Rosenbach, Hiroshi Ito, Mona Hatoum, Paul Garrin, and Steina and Woody Vasulka.

In 1990, Veruschka Baksa-Soós stated "The annual anthologies, published by local editors (artist groups from 12 cities), are in fact a rich find for semoticians, topologists and visual philosophers. With this now 65 hours long video archive, a vocabulary of the 1980s has been made available to the public."

== Availability ==
The Infermental collection is accessible to the public at the Center for Art and Media Karlsruhe.
