= Sascha Weidner =

German photographer (1974–2015)

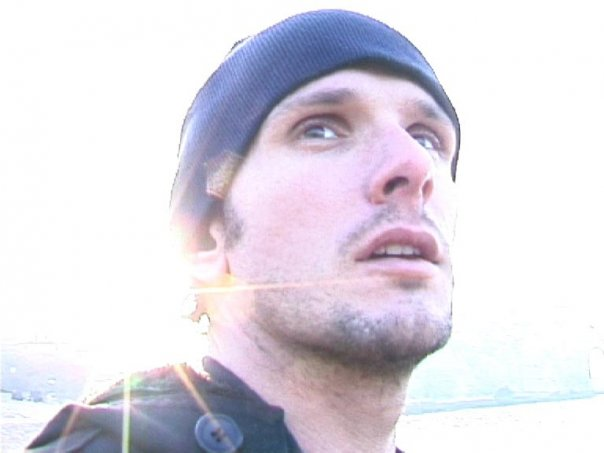
- Sascha Weidner in 2009
- Born: 1 August 1974; Georgsmarienhütte, West Germany
- Died: 9 April 2015 (aged 40); Norden, Germany
- Education: Braunschweig University of Art
- Known for: Art photography
- Website: www.saschaweidner.de

Sascha Weidner (1 August 1974 in Georgsmarienhütte – 9 April 2015 in Norden) was a German photographer and artist, who lived and worked in Belm and Berlin. Weidner's work deals with the creation of a radical subjective pictorial world. His photographs are characterized by perceptions, aspirations and illuminate the world of the subconscious. His work has been exhibited and published internationally.

== Personal life ==
As a teenager, Weidner was interested in the arts and was an active painter. From 1992 to 1993 Weidner lived abroad in Solon, Ohio, USA. After attaining a baccalaureate in 1995 at the Graf-Stauffenberg-Gymnasium in Osnabrück, Weidner studied Fine Arts and Visual Communication from 1996 to 2004 at the Academy of Fine Arts in Brunswick, completing his studies with an honorary diploma. In 2004 he undertook a mentorship, studying fine art photography under Dörte Eißfeldt. After this, Weidner worked as a freelance artist in Belm and Berlin.

Weidner's paintings are characterized often by trips that he was able to undertake through various scholarships. In 2004 and 2006 he traveled with the German Academic Exchange Service for several months at a time to Los Angeles. In 2013 he gained a scholarship from the Goethe Institute at the Villa Kamogawa in Kyoto, Japan, and in 2014 at the Three Shadows Photography Art Centre in Beijing, China.

From 2010 to 2012 Weidner was a lecturer in photography at the Academy of Fine Arts in Stuttgart. In 2012 he was appointed as a member of the German Photographic Academy.

Weidner died on April 9, 2015, due to the consequences of an unexpected heart failure.

For his work he was awarded, among others, the "Stiftungspreis Fotografie" of the Alison & Peter Klein Foundation and in 2010 the Young Art Prize for Film and Media Arts Berlin of the Academy of Arts Berlin.

Weidner's work has been presented nationally and internationally in solo and group exhibitions.

== Art ==
Weidner described himself as a "romantically moved traveler" and his photographs as highly subjective. For him the medium of photography was the artistic means of expression in order to weave together real worlds with the own internal images. From his mostly biographical photo expeditions, picture essays arose about essential questions of human existence.

Over a decade of creating images, an ever-evolving picture library came together in which, as the photographer said, "everything is important: Cultural events, disasters, clichés, banalities, Political things" Weidner composed his works from a large pool, which was composed of family photographs, own work and found or mass media and borrowed images from the history of art. Thereby boundaries between staging and authenticity blurred, to highlight the often unreal, sometimes suggestive atmosphere of reality.

His motives as well as the titles of his works and exhibitions refer to biographical references and metaphors of his own experiences. For example: "Until it hurts", "What remains", "The presence of absence", "Staying is nowhere" or "Beauty remains".

Weidner's canon of images sprang from the way of life of young people and tells of the "perceptions, longings and visions of those generations who experienced their youth in the 80s, 90s and 2000s." Therefore, Weidner's approach was very relevant for these periods and gave evidence both of an artistic consideration of actual and imaginary spaces.

In essence, a melancholic perspective on the world marked Weidner's point of view. The basic patterns in his image systems are attributed to his very own relationships. He contrasts subjects such as life and death, beauty and transience as well as questioning origin, identity and self-determination. In this sense, Weidner was not limited to portraying his own environment, but spoke of life itself.

Weidner's temporary art installations were often based on interactions between the media and the viewers. The methodology Weidner applied to his work is connected to the tradition of photographers such as Nan Goldin, Larry Clark or Juergen Teller. His understanding of composition and coloring in his photographic series also recalls the lightness and transparency of the elemental and symbolic images of Japanese photographer Rinko Kawauchi.

== Bibliography (selection) ==
- Zeitgeschichte der Bundesrepublik Deutschland. 1997.
- Gastspiel. Exhibition catalogue, Kunstverein Hannover, Richter 1998.
- Gesundheit. Exhibition catalogue, Kunsthaus Essen, Petrikirche Dortmund & HBK Braunschweig 1999.
- Nach Cindy Exhibition catalogue, Mönchehaus für Moderne Kunst, Goslar 2000.
- fremde.orte. Museum für Photographie, Brunswick 2003.
- Das Schreiben der Bilder. Salon, Köln 2004, ISBN 3-89770-225-8.
- Eißfeldts Meister. Exhibition catalogue, APEX Kunstverein pro art, Göttingen 2006.
- Förderpreis Fotografie 2005. Appelhans, Brunswick 2006.
- Beauty Remains. Appelhans, Brunswick 2006, ISBN 3-937664-44-0.
- Enduring Beauty. Appelhans, Brunswick 2007, ISBN 978-3-937664-70-5.
- Die Liebe zum Licht – Fotografie im 20. & 21. Jahrhundert. Kunstmuseum Celle, Städtische Galerie Delmenhorst & Museum Bochum 2007, ISBN 978-3-8093-0236-0.
- Dialogues & Attitudes. Exhibition catalogue, Hatje Cantz, Ostfildern 2007, ISBN 978-3-7757-1987-2.
- Bis es wehtut / Until it hurts. Appelhans, Brunswick 2008, ISBN 978-3-937664-79-8.
- Am Wasser gebaut. Reiss-Engelhorn-Museen, Mannheim 2009.
- Ease and Eagerness. Hatje Cantz, Ostfildern 2009, ISBN 978-3-7757-2433-3.
- Future Images. Ore Motta, Milan 2010, ISBN 978-88-6413-017-0, 24
- Was übrig bleibt / What remains. Appelhans, Brunswick 2010, ISBN 978-3-941737-15-0.
- Hijacked 2 – Australian and German Photography. Exhibition catalogue, Kehrer, Heidelberg 2010, ISBN 978-3-86828-126-2.
- Schloss Salder, Neue Kunst aus Niedersachsen. Exhibition catalogue, Salzgitter 2011, ISBN 978-3-941737-58-7.
- Traummänner – Starfotografen zeigen ihre Vision vom Ideal. Exhibition catalogue, Dumont, Cologne 2011, ISBN 978-3-8321-9362-1.
- Sascha Weidner Catalogues, No. 5 – Lay down close by, Australian Centre for Photography. Berlin 2013, ISBN 978-1-922091-03-1.
- Sascha Weidner Catalogues, No. 4 – Unveiled, The Sydney Project, Australian Centre for Photography. Berlin 2013, ISBN 978-1-922091-03-1.
- Sascha Weidner Catalogues, No. 3 – The Pictures of Others, Goethe Institute Prague. Berlin 2013, ISBN 978-3-928224-09-3.
- Sascha Weidner Catalogues, No. 2 – The sorrows of young W., Goethe Institute Prague. Berlin 2013, ISBN 978-3-928224-08-6.
- Sascha Weidner Catalogues, No. 1 – Last song, C / O Berlin. Berlin 2013, ISBN 978-3-928224-07-9.
- Entrepreneur 4.0. Exhibition catalogue, seltmann+söhne, Berlin 2014, ISBN 978-3-944721-19-4.
- Klasse.Buch – 64 Positionen aus der Klasse Eißfeldt. Kehrer, Heidelberg 2014, ISBN 978-3-86828-583-3.
- Des Sascha Weidners und des Jan Böttchers einzig wahre Erlebnisse zu Wasser und zu Land, zu Pferd und zu Fuß, im Krieg und im Frieden, in der Luft so wie in den niedersächsischen Ländern und Bremen in diesem Jahr ganz neu verfasst und fotografiert von ihnen selbst., Niedersächsische Sparkassenstiftung, Hannover 2015, ISBN 978-3-00-049834-3.
