= Belm =

- Municipality
- Coat of arms

- Location of Belm within Osnabrück district
- Interactive map of Belm
- Location within Germany Location within Lower Saxony
- Coordinates: 52°18′N 08°08′E
- Country: Germany
- State: Lower Saxony
- District: Osnabrück
- Subdivisions: 5

Government
  - Mayor (2021–26): Viktor Hermeler (Ind.)

Area
  - Total: 46.64 km^{2} (18.01 sq mi)
- Elevation: 81 m (266 ft)

Population (2025-12-31)
  - Total: 13,907
  - Density: 298.2/km^{2} (772.3/sq mi)
- Time zone: UTC+01:00 (CET)
  - Summer (DST): UTC+02:00 (CEST)
- Postal codes: 49191
- Dialling codes: 05406
- Vehicle registration: OS, BSB, MEL, WTL
- Website: www.belm.de

Belm (German pronunciation: [bɛlm]) is a municipality in the district of Osnabrück, in Lower Saxony, Germany. It is located in the Wiehengebirge, approximately 7 km northeast of Osnabrück, and is therefore part of the city-agglomeration of Osnabrück. It is seated in the middle of the TERRA.vita Nature Park. Two little right tributaries of the river Hase flow through it.

The municipality is divided into 5 boroughs: Belm, Powe, Icker, Haltern and Vehrte

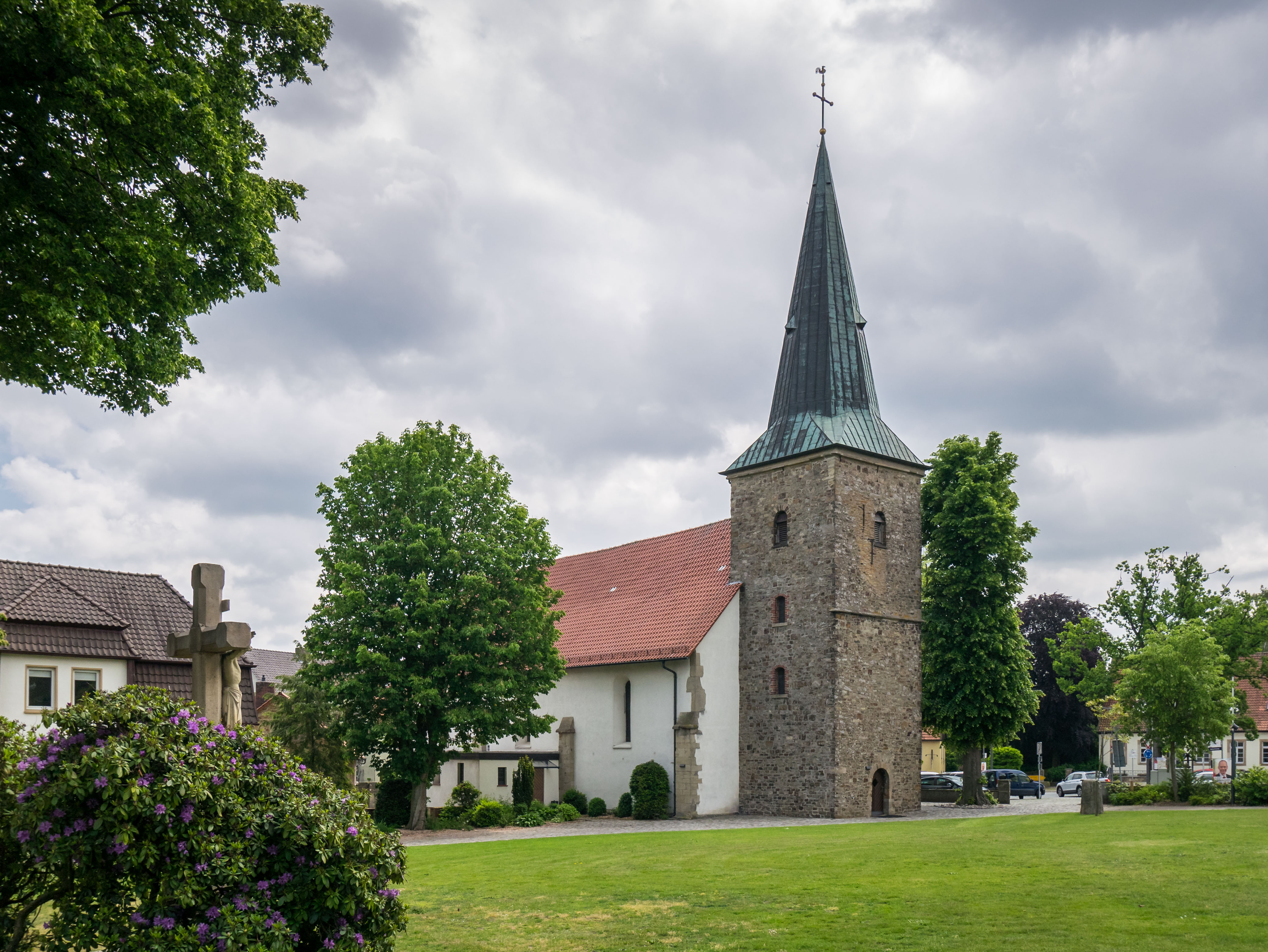
Catholic romanesque church St. Dionysius (built between 1230 and 1250) in Belm

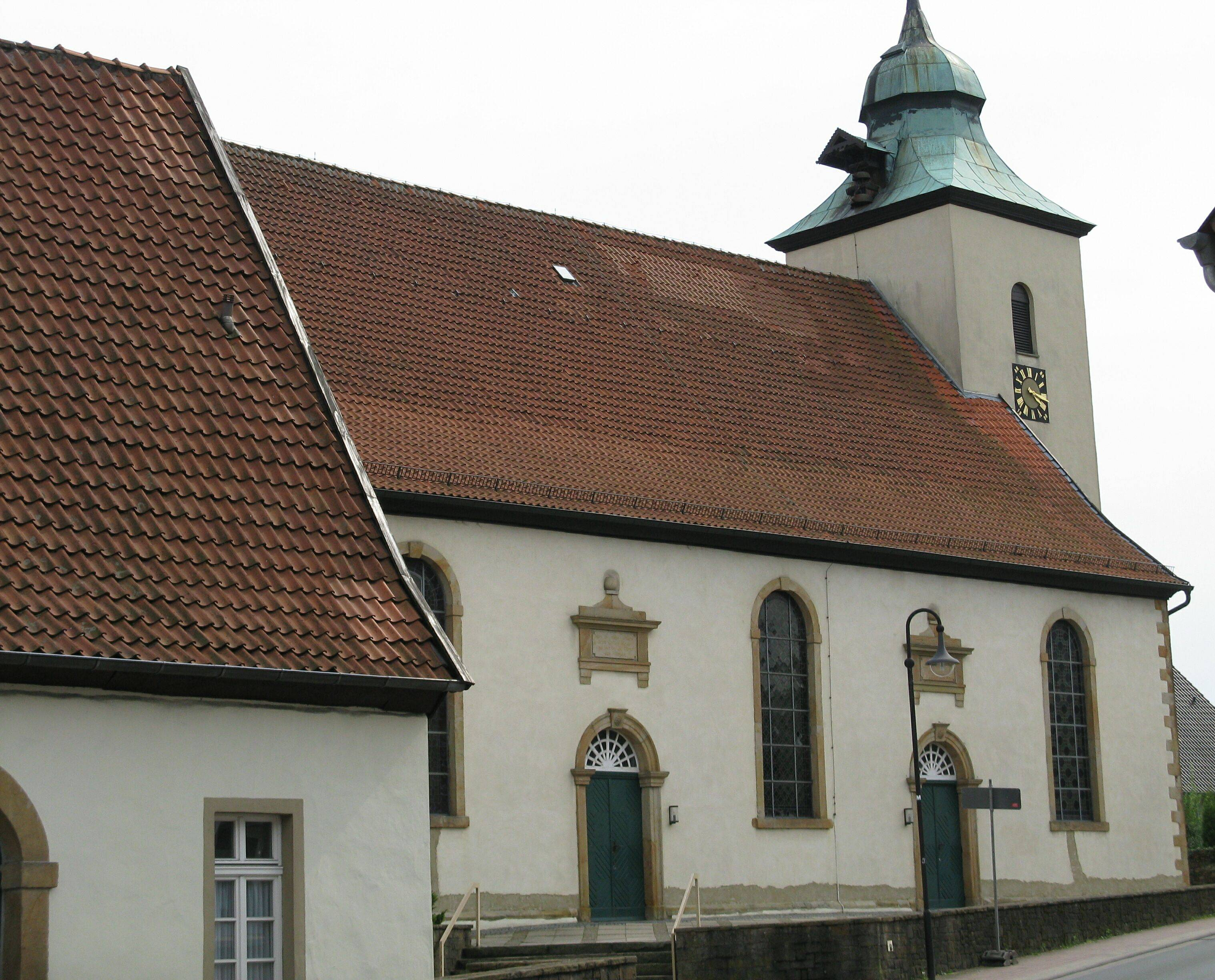
Protestant Christchurch in Belm, built from 1815 to 1819. In 1812, the Protestants received permission from Napoleon I in Moscow to build a church.

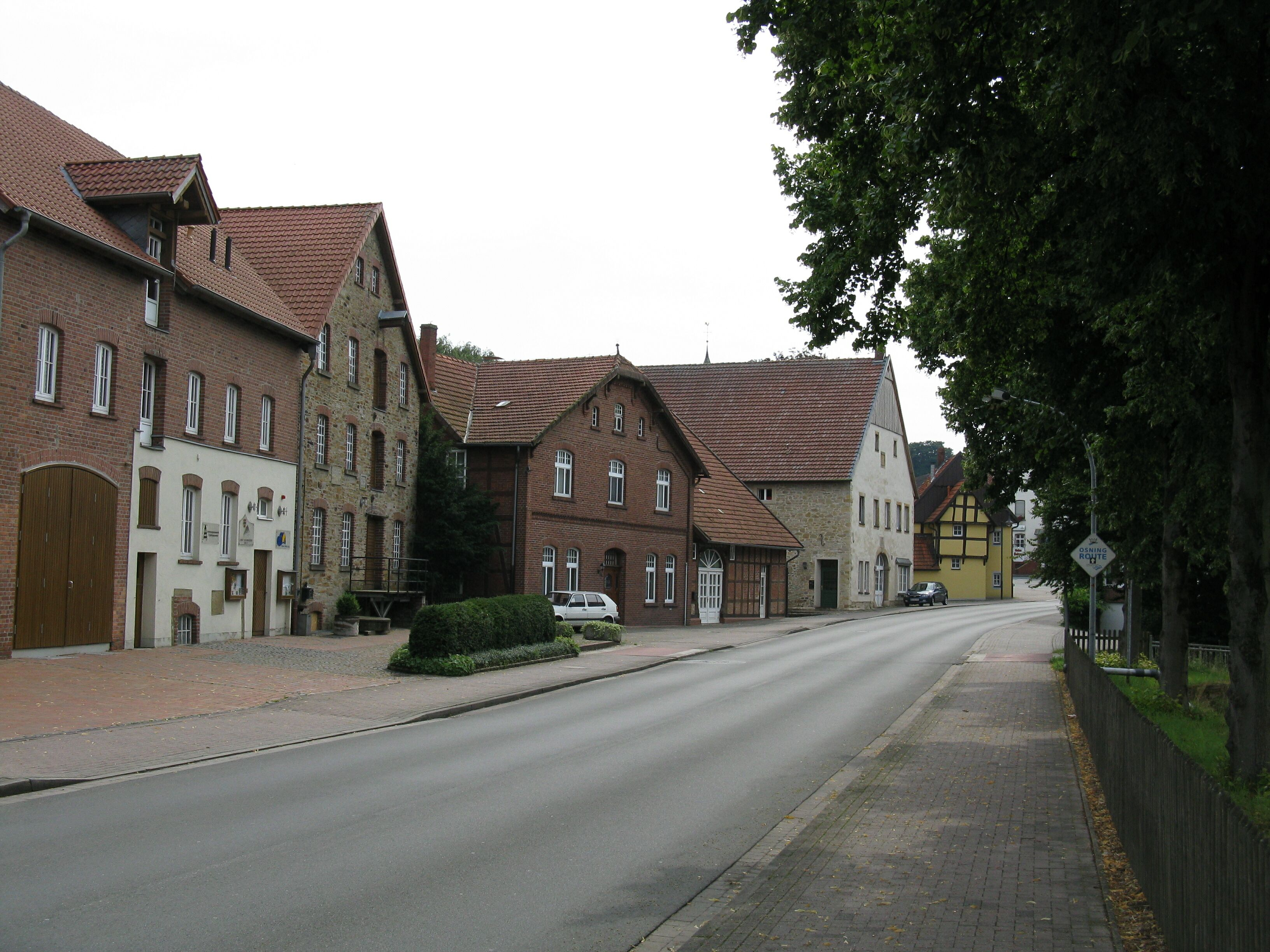
Old water mill, founded approx. 840 in Belm

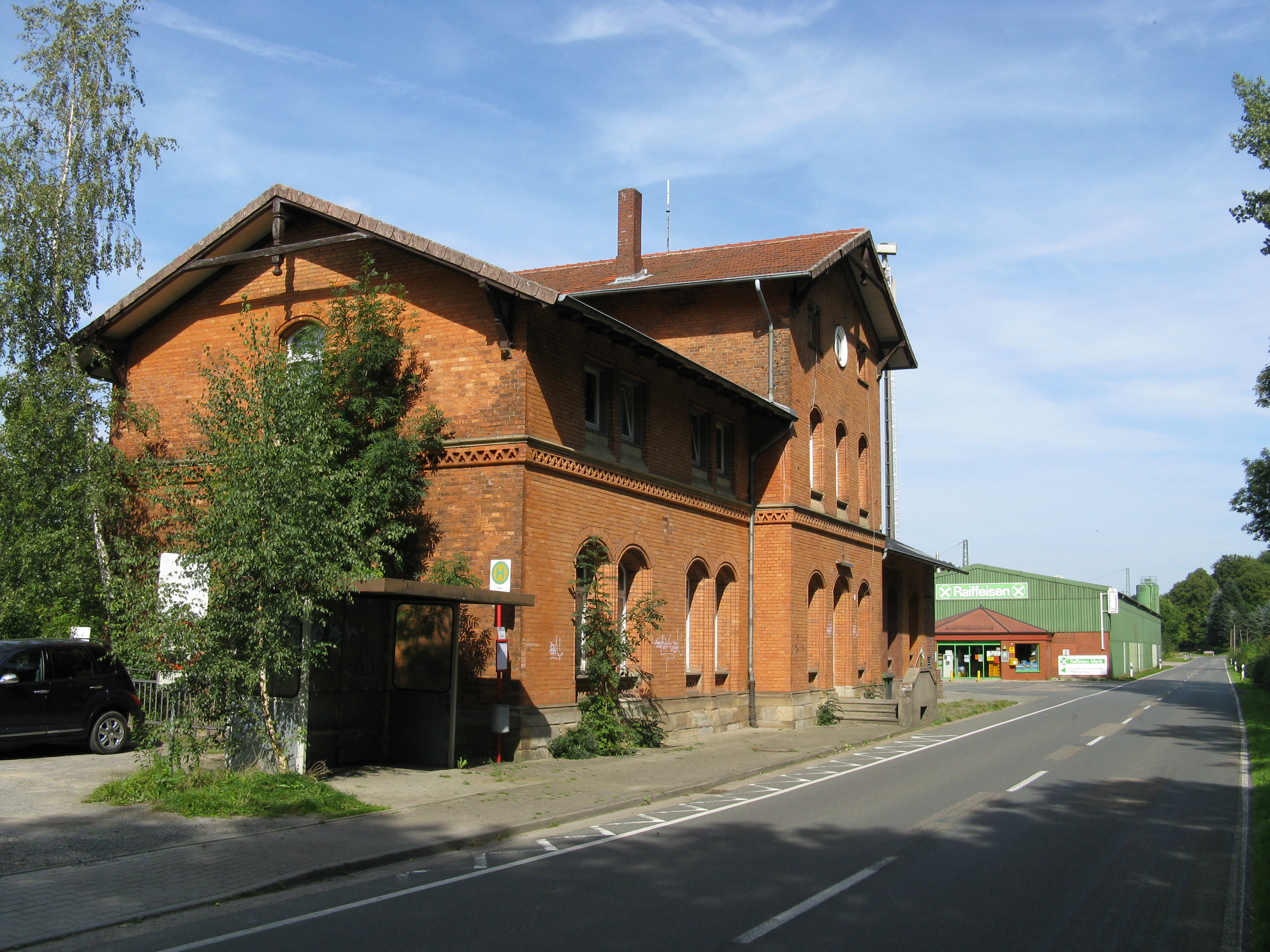
Old Vehrte railway station

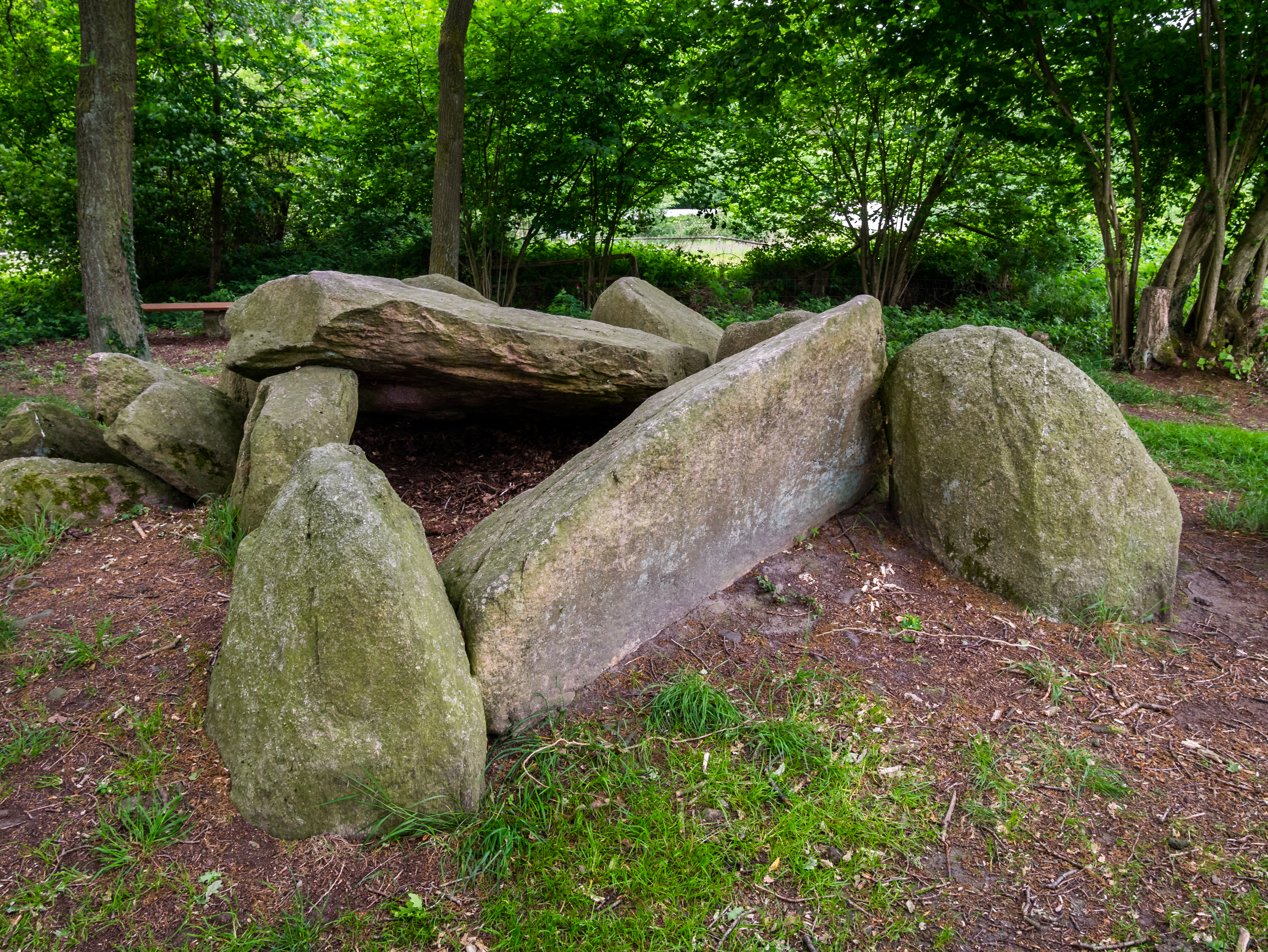
Megalithic tomb "Devil's Baking Oven" in Vehrte

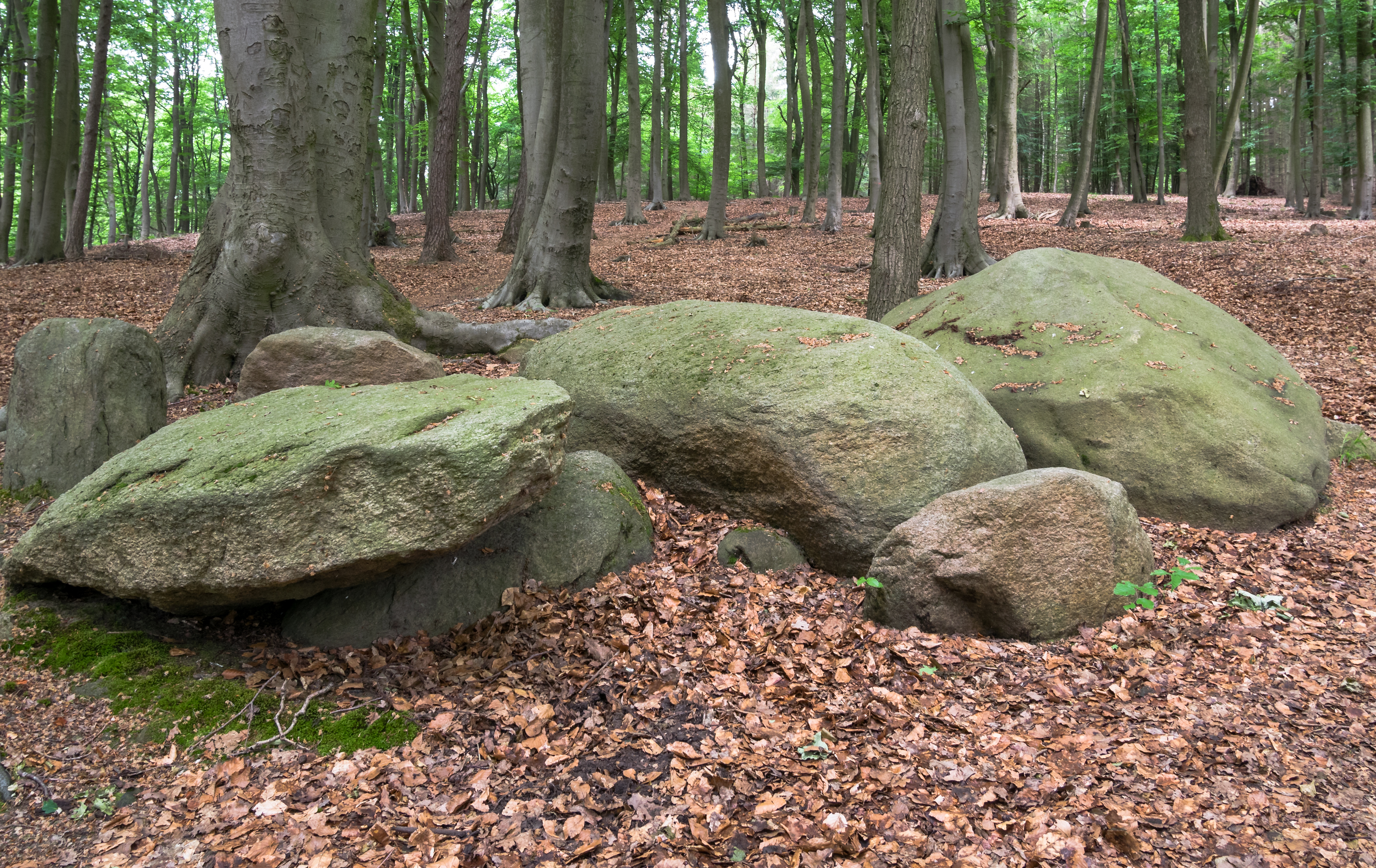
Megalithic tomb "Devil's Dough Trough" in Vehrte

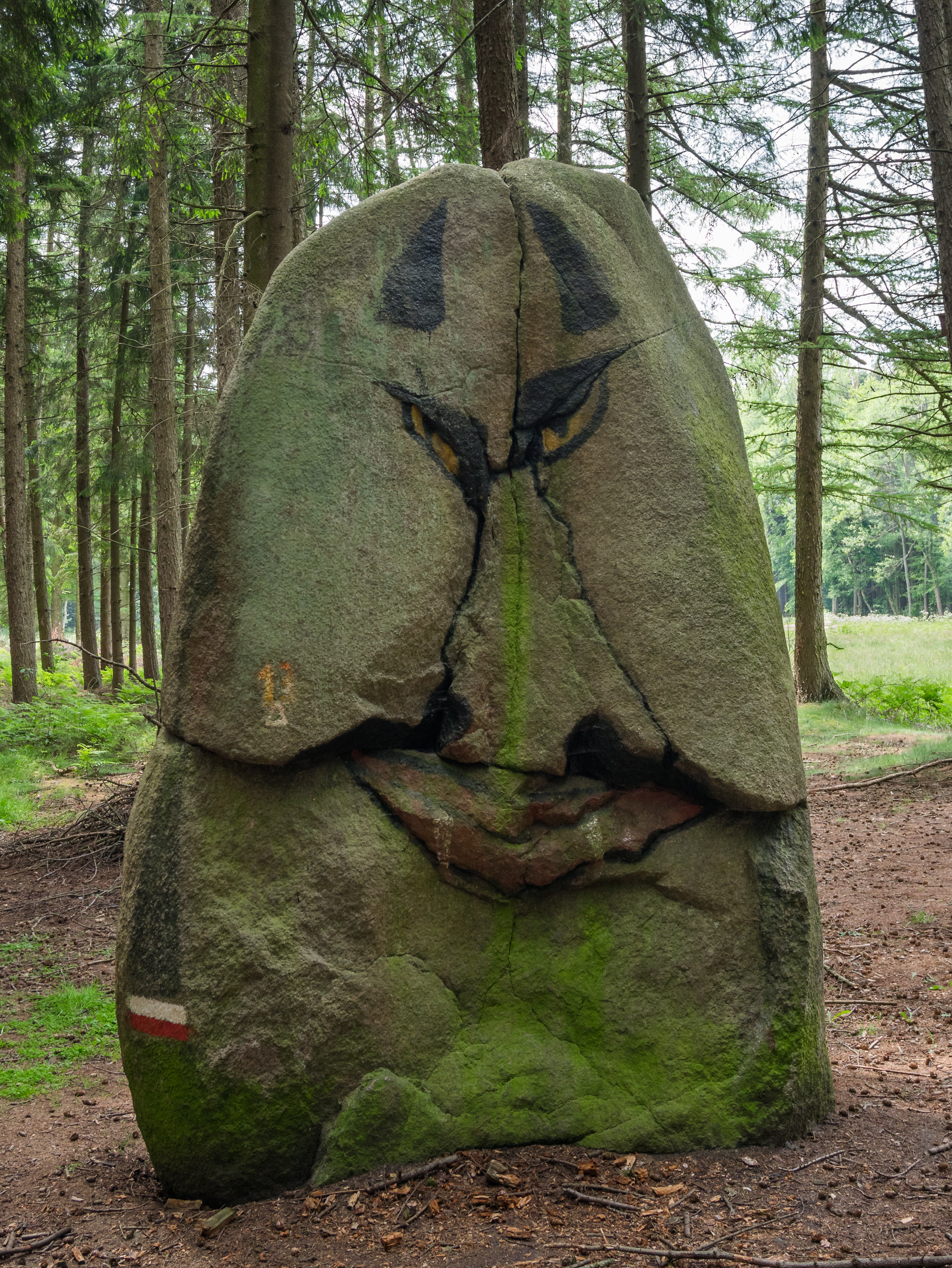
Glacial erratic "Devil's Stone" in Vehrte

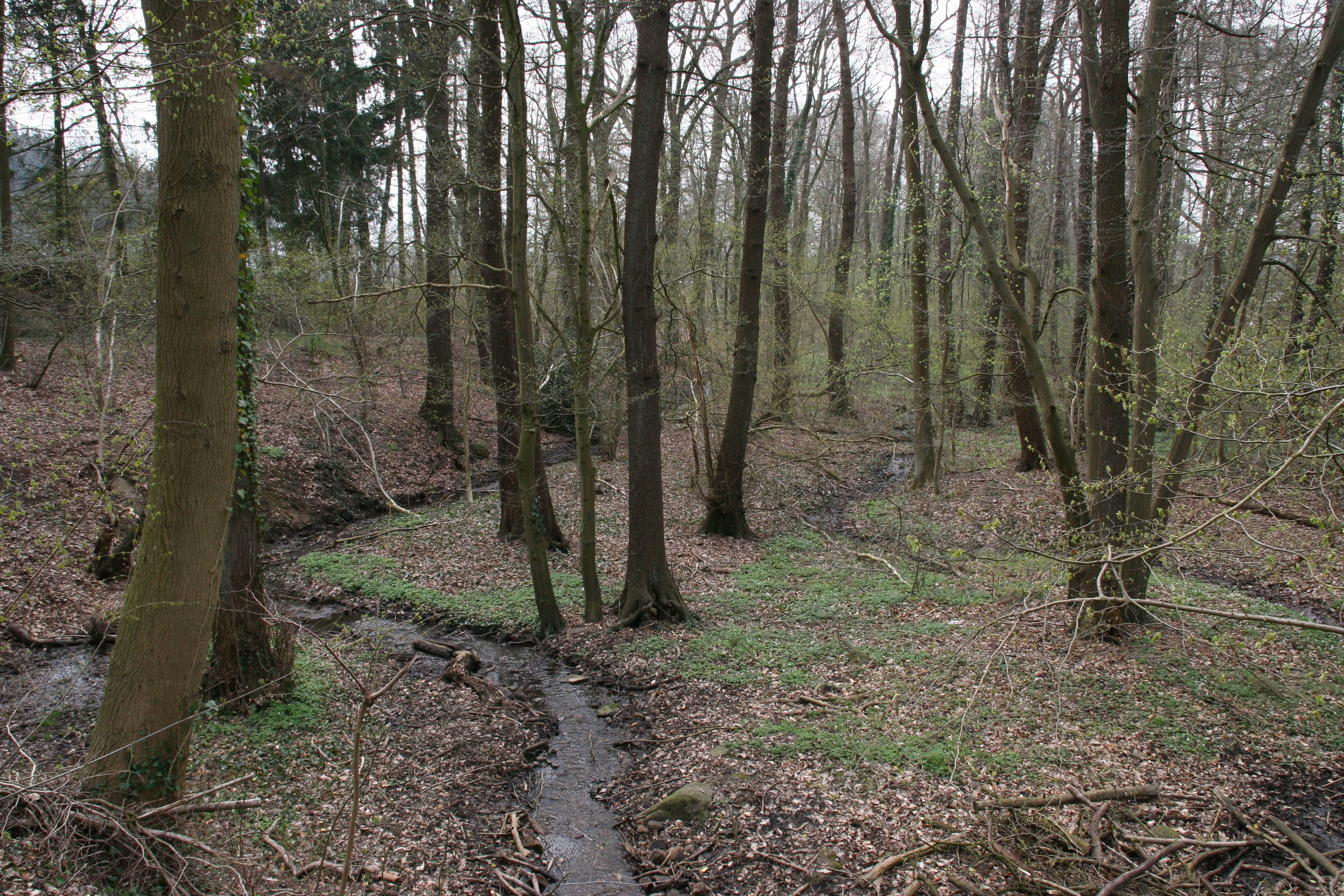
Feeder beck of the river Nette in Vehrte

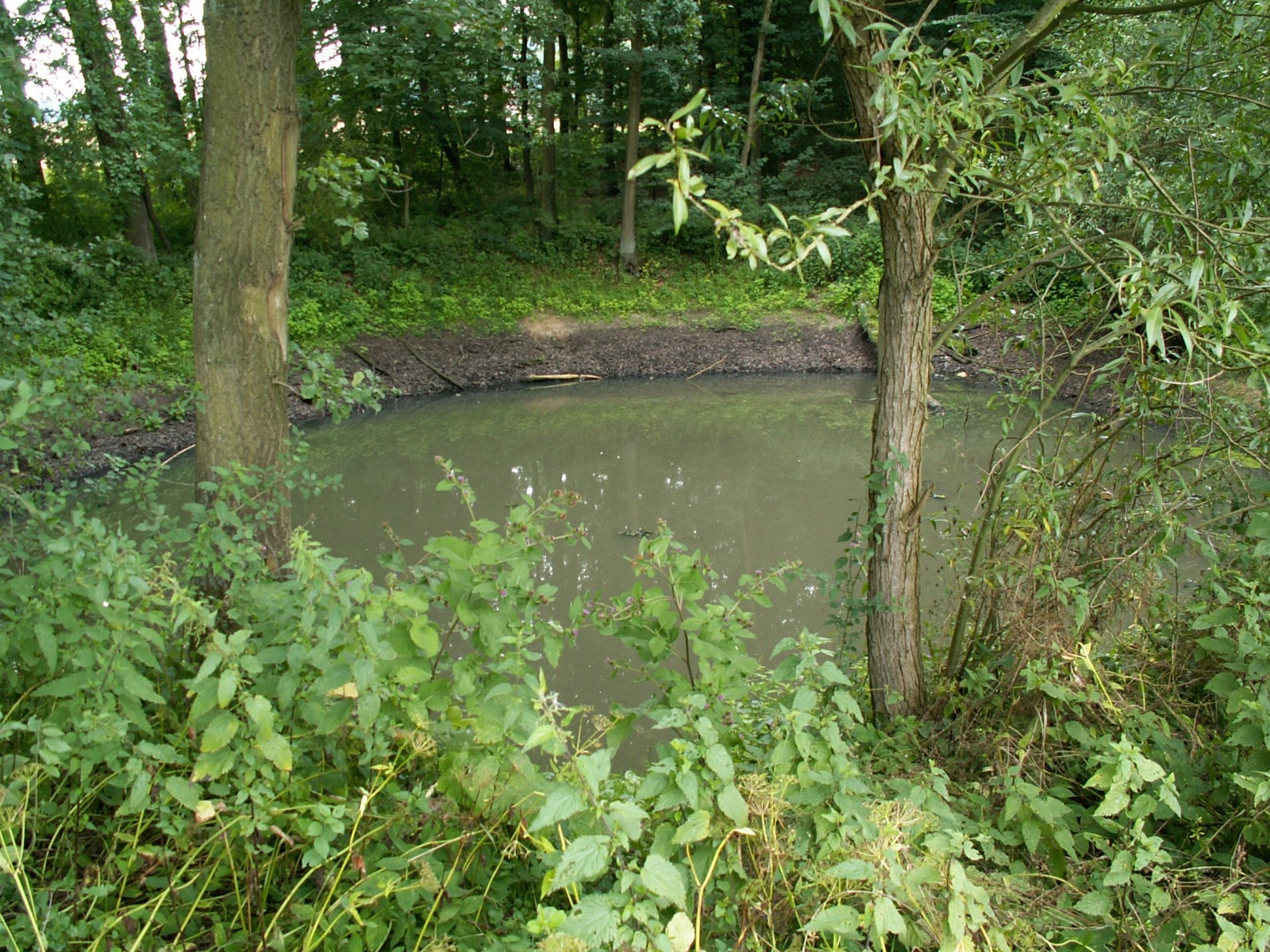
Sinkhole "Icker Loch" in Icker

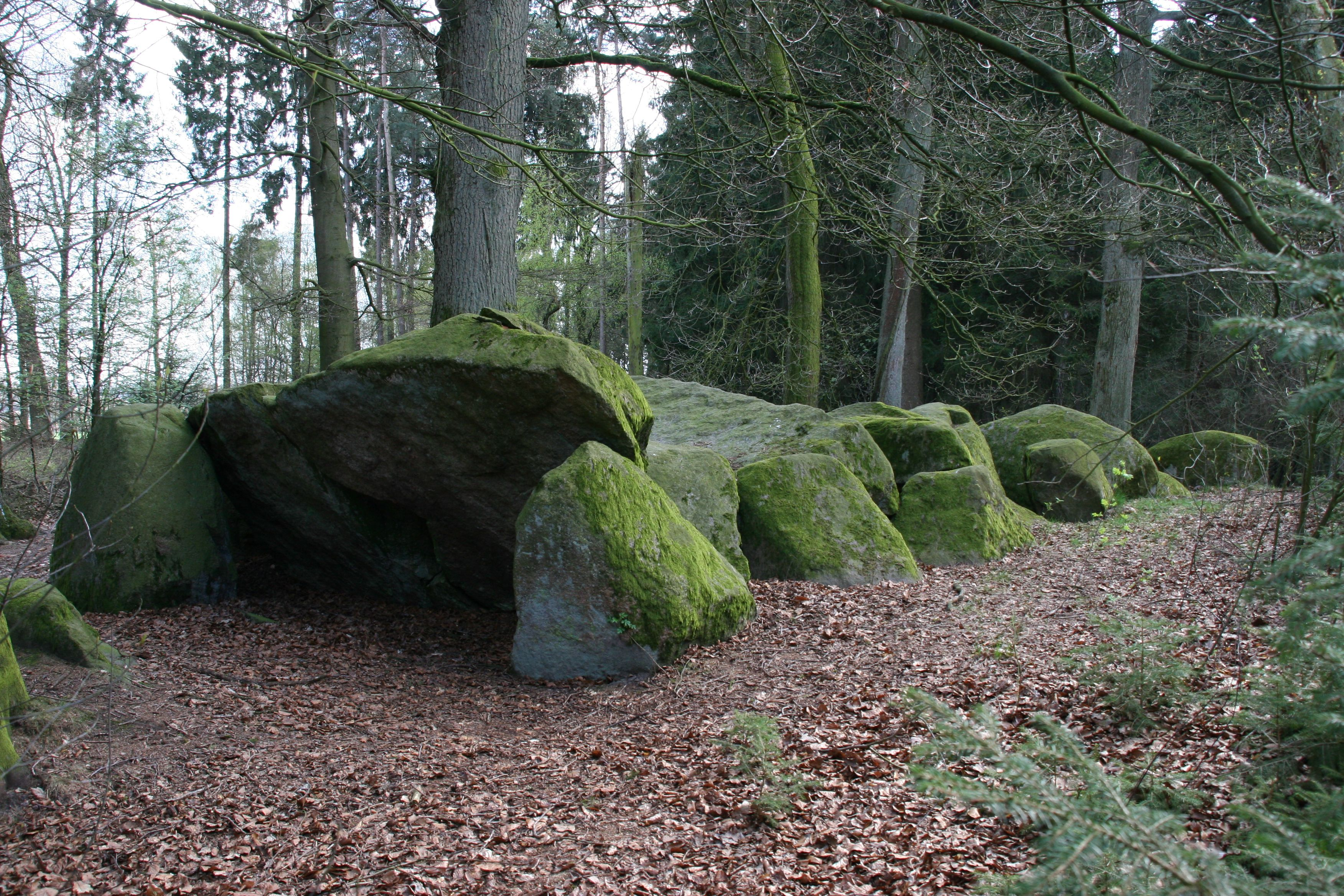
Megalithic tomb "Sloopsteine of Haltern"

== International relations ==
Belm is twinned with:

- Elterlein, Germany, since 2004
- Kolno, Poland, since 2006
- (United States) Englewood, USA, since 2007

== Famous people ==
- Ingo Petzke (born September 18, 1947), an internationally acknowledged German film scholar, filmmaker and author
- Sascha Weidner (born August 1, 1974, died April 9, 2015), German photographer and artist
