= Three Shadows Photography Art Centre =

Art centre in Beijing, China

Coordinates: 39°59′50″N 116°29′51″E

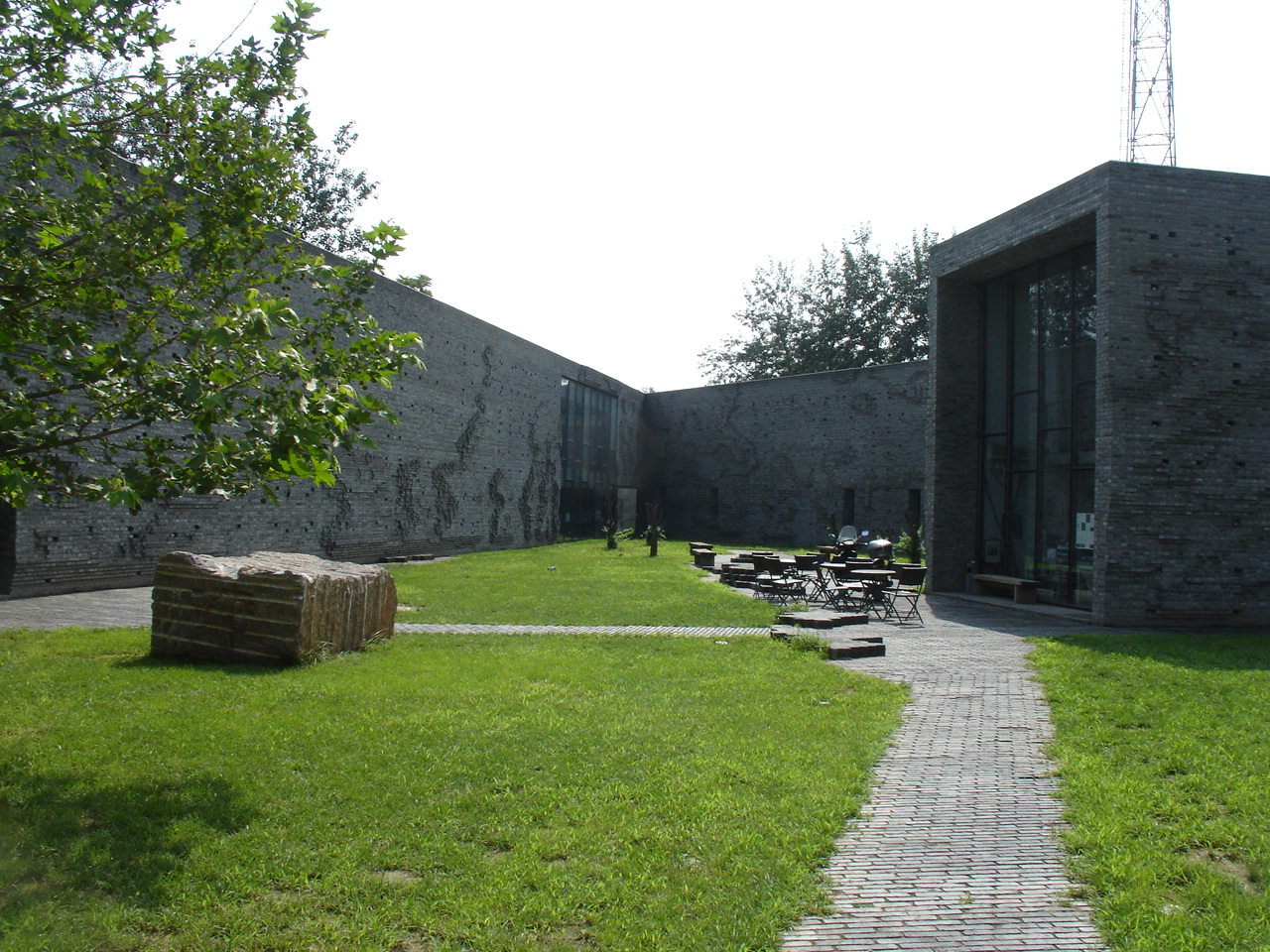
Three Shadows courtyard, Summer 2010

Three Shadows Photography Art Centre (Chinese: 三影堂摄影艺术中心) is a non-profit art centre in Beijing established in 2007 by photographers RongRong and inri. Three Shadows is the first contemporary art space dedicated exclusively to photography and other lens-based art in China. A converted auto repair yard, the 4,600 square meter complex includes 880 square meters of gallery space and was designed by renowned artist and architect Ai Weiwei. Three Shadows is situated in the art district of Caochangdi, on the outskirts of Beijing.

== History ==
Three Shadows was founded in June 2007 by RongRong, from China, and inri, from Japan.

== Mission ==
Three Shadows supports and facilitates exhibitions, education programs, publications, programs for artists, and independent events and engagements. Its mission is to:

- Explore and showcase contemporary Chinese photography
- Rediscover important photographic works from the past and give them the place they deserve in the history of photography in China
- Initiate a dialogue between China and the international art scene in order to establish China's presence in the global photography world
- Serve as an independent mechanism to introduce contemporary photography to the general public
- Influence and facilitate the development of China's contemporary photography

== Notable programs and events ==
=== The Caochangdi PhotoSpring ===
The Caochangdi PhotoSpring is working in a three-year partnership with Les Rencontres d'Arles Photography Festival to show the Arles' programs outside France for the first time. The aim of the Caochangdi PhotoSpring is to build a platform for photography in the art district through an annual event where photographers, photography collectors and the public can meet to have access to high quality works. For the first time, twenty Caochangdi galleries will join forces to celebrate photography from China and abroad with Caochangdi PhotoSpring.

=== Artist in Residence Program ===
Three Shadows has an Artist-in-residence program to provide international photographers, artists, curators, and academics with an opportunity to live and work in China. Such artists have been among others Nirmala Karuppiah, Ken Kitano and Sascha Weidner.

== Library ==
The multilingual Three Shadows art library holds close to 4,000 volumes.
