= Noam Braslavsky =

Israeli artist and curator

Noam Braslavsky (Hebrew: נועם בראסלבסקי; born 1961) is an Israeli artist and curator who lives and works in Berlin.

== Biography ==
Noam Brasklavsky was born in Poria Illit, Israel. In the early 1980s, Braslavsky studied at the Bezalel Academy of Art and Design in Jerusalem, subsequently studying Film at the Beit Zvi acting school in Ramat Gan and completing his Master of Fine Arts at the Multimedia Department of the Düsseldorf Art Academy with Nam June Paik/Nan Hoover.

== Art career ==
In the 1980s and 1990s he created manipulative, interactive room installations, which he displayed in dark or black rooms (he speaks of “black cubes" in contrast to the usual white cubes). "Shelter" (concrete, steel, glass, Plexiglas and sea-shells) was set on fire in an act of sabotage years later at his solo exhibition "Magic as Existential Need" in Tel Aviv; only the steel frame and the concrete pedestals survived.

Braslavsky’s works are traps that take their cues from sacred architecture, nature and society. He analyzes manipulative mechanisms that influence and control the human psyche, translating them in simplified form into rooms. Some examples are artificial wombs, purring machines, compulsive hats, labyrinths and enormous cocoons.

One of his early works (1984) explores the abolition of space and the dissolution of its boundaries, and can also be seen as a sort of virtual (miniature) stage for his subsequent creative work. "Blue" is a second head, a perceptual fuelling station that supplies nothing but pure blue light, suspending the perception of space for a time while promoting pure vision.

On 21 October 2010, Braslavsky unveiled a life-sized sculpture of former Prime Minister of Israel, Ariel Sharon, who was in a persistent vegetative state after suffering a stroke in 2006, in a hospital bed with an IV drip at the Kishon Gallery in Tel Aviv. Knesset member Yoel Hasson described the work as “sickening voyeurism”, and Ronit Tirosh declared in the Knesset: “This is not art!” Menachem Wecker of the Houston Chronicle wrote: “But it will be interesting to see how viewers respond to the work. Will it be perceived as a piñata or a voodoo doll, or will it create a safe (aesthetic) space where viewers can transcend clichéd, extremist political discourse and use art as a medium to consider the man himself as he lies on what is almost certainly his death bed?”

In 2003 Braslavsky founded GdK (Galerie der Künste) in Berlin, shortly thereafter establishing the eponymous art association together with his wife Emma Braslavsky.

== Selected exhibitions ==
- 2014 The "shores of bikini" at "Above the Roofs of Berlin" Berlin.
- 2013 "Reflection" at "ArTicks" Beningston Gallery The Israel Museum, Jerusalem.
- 2013 2013 "reconciliation" at "The Spaces Below. The Spaces Above", exhibition in open space, Beit Hagefen, Haifa/Israel
- 2012 "Unattainable", MANIFESTA, Belgium
- 2012 "Middle-East Europe", DOX Museum, Prague
- 2010 "Ariel Sharon", Kishon Gallery, Tel Aviv/Israel
- 2010 "Mediators", The National Museum, Warsaw/Poland
- 2009 "n.b.l.", NCCA, Moscow/Russia
- 2008 "European Attitude", Zendai Museum of Modern Art, Shanghai/China
- 2008 “The Murakami Collection”, Faust Kunsthalle, Hanover/Deutschland (solo show)
- 2008 "Strictly Berlin - "Between Fiction and Fact", Berlin/Germany
- 2007 "Asia-Europe Mediations", New Synagogue, Poznan/Poland
- 2007 "Strictly Berlin - "Targets of Opportunity", Berlin/Germany
- 2007 "Pathos", Galerie Dieter Reitz, Kassel
- 2007 “The Artist as Readymade”, Berlin
- 2006 "Strictly Berlin 2000-2006", Berlin/Germany
- 2004 "zivilgeneratur", Berlin/Germany
- 2004 Artiade Exhibition Hall, Athens/Greece
- 2003 Central Exhibition Hall, St. Petersburg/Russia
- 2003 "Zufluchträume I-III" in the Tiergarten park, Berlin/Germany (solo show)
- 2002 "The Boundaries of Sculpture", Open Museum, Tefen-Beer Sheva/Israel
- 2000 "Festival of Vision", Hong Kong/China
- 1998 "Magic as Existential Need", Hamumche Art Space, Tel Aviv/Israel (solo show)
- 1996 "The Freedom to Choose", aktions galerie, Berlin/Germany (solo show)
- 1995 "The Treasure of the Baltic Sea", MS Stubnitz, Rostock/Germany (solo show)
- 1993 "Creator of the Worlds", Laznia Art Space, Gdansk/Poland (solo show)
- 1992 "Shelter", Produzentengalerie Düsseldorf/Deutschland (solo show)
- 1989 "Enlightened Darkness", Zman Amiti - Alternative Art Space, Tel Aviv/Israel (solo show)

== See also ==
- Israeli art
