= Großer Kellenberg =

- Location within Lower Saxony

Highest point
- Elevation: 211 m above sea level (NHN) (692 ft)
- Coordinates: 52°15′52″N 8°26′55″E

Geography
- Location: Osnabrück, Lower Saxony, Germany
- Parent range: Wiehen Hills

The Großer Kellenberg is a hill, 211 m above sea level (NHN), in the Wiehen range in northern Germany. It is exactly the same height as the hill known as Schwarzer Brink, which stands opposite the Großer Kellenberg on the Egge, a parallel side ridge of the Wiehen. The Großer Kellenberg lies within the county of Osnabrück, on the territory of the town of Melle, and thus in the Lower Saxon part of the range. The state border with North Rhine-Westphalia runs one kilometre to the east of the summit. The nearest villages are Rödinghausen, three kilometres to the southeast, and Büscherheide which is 1.5 kilometres to the north.

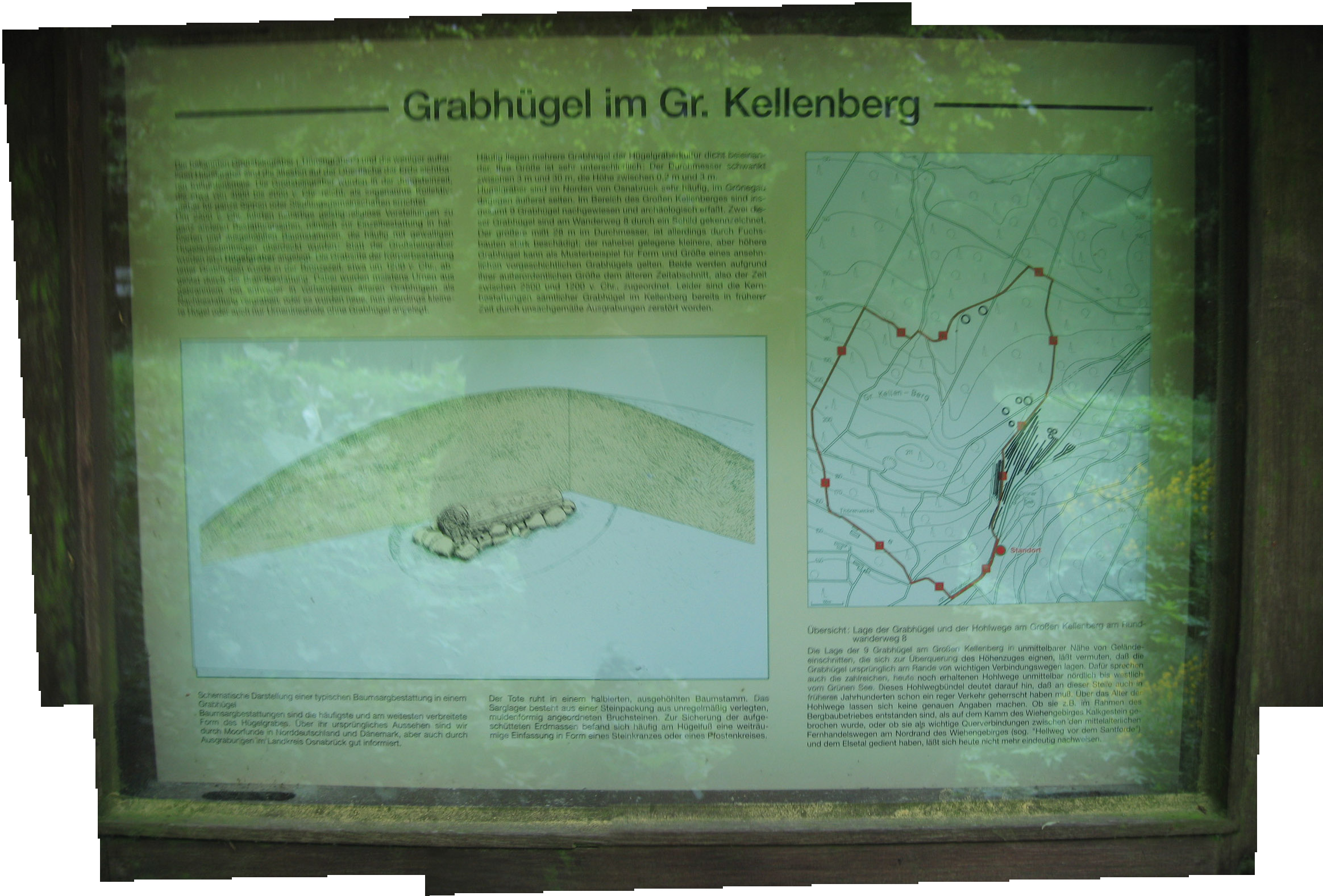
Information board about the Kellenberg tumulus

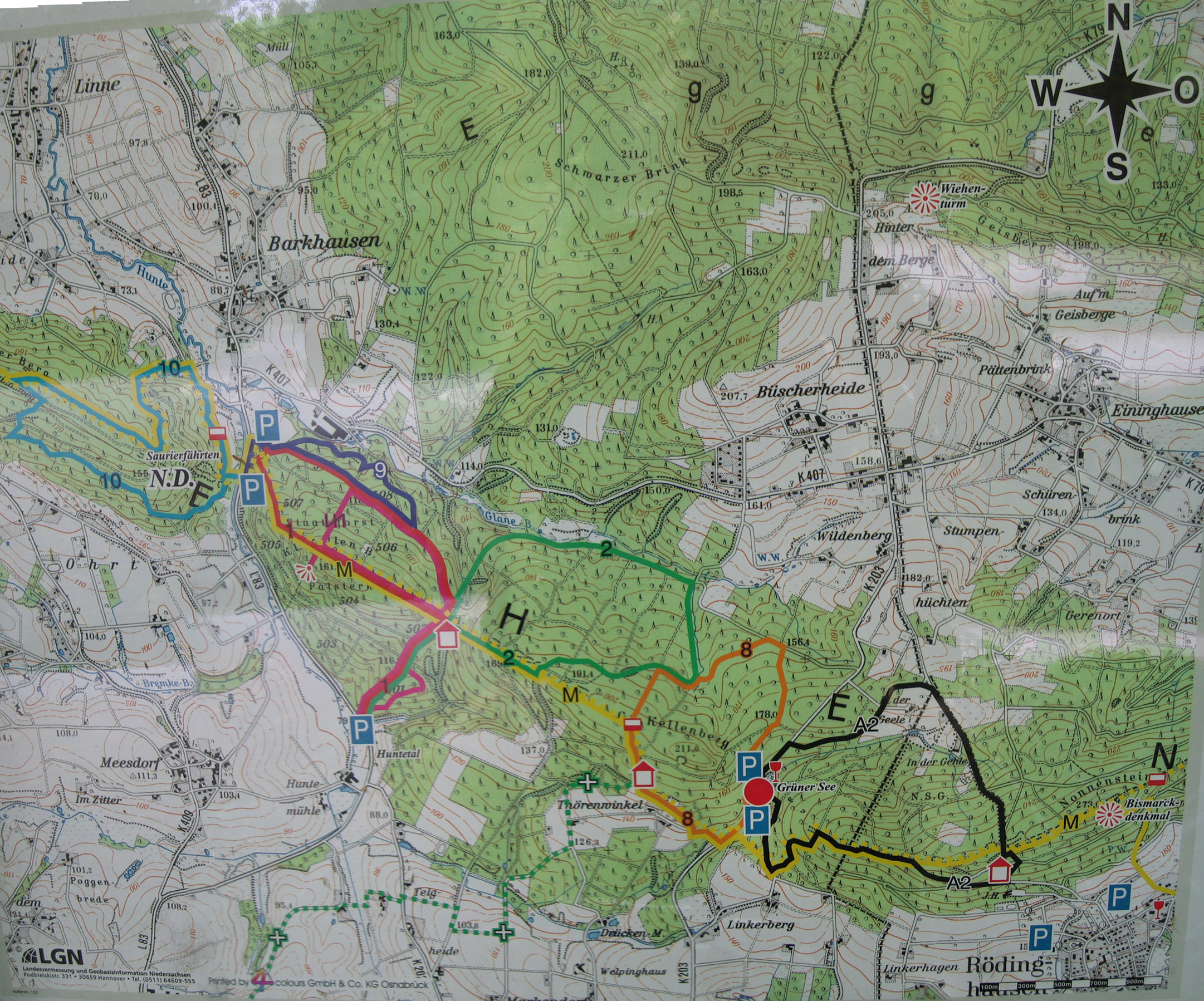
Map section with the Großer Kellenberg. The circular walk around the Kellenberg is marked by the orange line and no. 8

The Großer Kellenberg is the westernmost hill on the main chain of the Wiehen that attains a height of over 200 metres. It is thus also the highest hill in the Lower Saxon part of the main chain of the Wiehen Hills. That said, the hill is not the highest point in the borough of Melle – this is in the Melle Hills, that lie to the west but are just a secondary chain of the Wiehen. The next higher hill is the Rödinghauser Berg (274 m) which is 2 kilometres to the east; two kilometers to the west is its namesake, the 161-metre-high Kleiner Kellenberg ("Little Kellenberg"). At the eastern foot of the hill lies the Grüner See. To the north, between Büscherheide and the summit flows the Glanebach. Although it is on the main chain, the Großer Kellenberg does not form a prominent watershed in this area, because both the Glanebach, and the in- and outflows of the Grüner See empty into the River Hunte after a few kilometres. This is because the Hunte breaks through the Wiehen Hills 2.5 kilometres west of the Großer Kellenberg.

The hill marks the end of the 3rd stage and start of the 4th stage of the Wittekindsweg, the ridgeway on the main hill chain. In addition, the 3-kilometre-long Großer Kellenberg Circular Path (Rundweg Großer Kellenberg) runs around the hill.

== Tumuli ==
There are several tumuli (Hügelgräber) on the eastern and northern slopes of the hill and partly in the valley bottom of the Grüner See. The aforementioned circular walk goes past them.
