= Refuge castle =

Castle-like defensive location

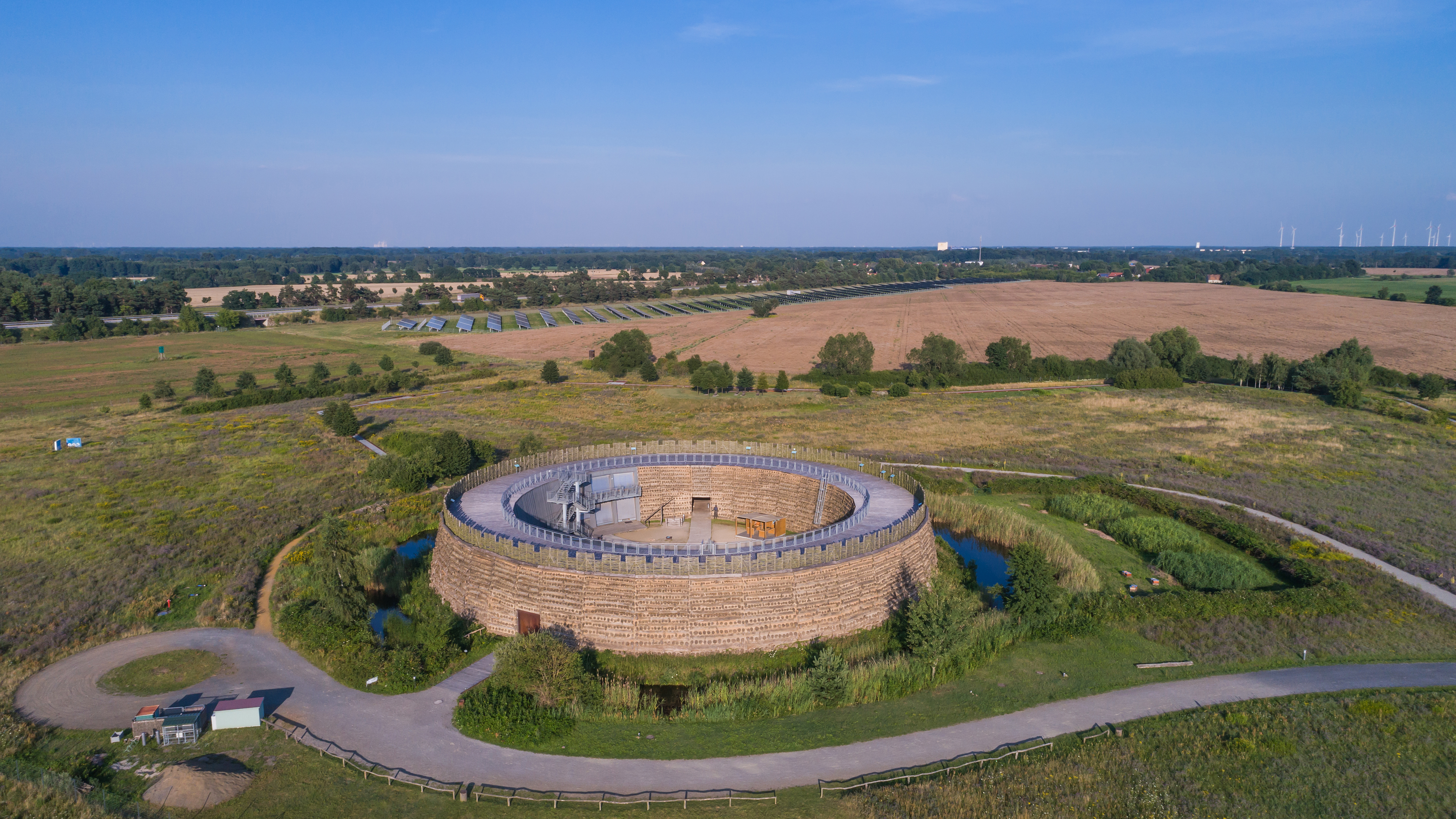
Reconstructed Slavic refuge castle of Raddusch (Lower Lusatia)

A refuge castle or refuge fort (German: Fliehburg, also Fluchtburg, Volksburg, Bauernburg or Vryburg) is a castle-like defensive location, usually surrounded by ramparts, that is not permanently occupied but acts as a temporary retreat for the local population when threatened by war or attack. In former times such sites were also described as giant castles (German: Hünenburgen) because their origin was ascribed to giants.

== History ==
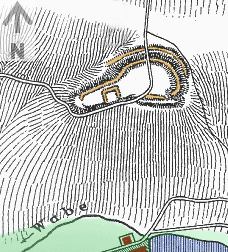
A presumed refuge castle: Krimmelburg in the Elm, part of the Reitlingsbefestigungen fortifications

In Europe a multitude of large protohistoric sites surrounded by earthworks has been uncovered by archaeological excavations, many over 100 metres in diameter, that are understood to be refuge castles. Amongst ancient historical references to them are the refuge castles of the Gauls described by Caesar as oppida, although they could also be permanent settlements. Similar ringwork (Ringwall) systems were built by the various Germanic and Slavic tribes, the latter until well into the Middle Ages period. Such systems are also known as hillforts (Wallburgen), the primary construction material being earth, but wood and stone were also used in a variety of construction methods.

As a rule they have no towers, but occasionally superstructures resembling gate towers occur (see Bennigsen Castle). Refuge castles of this type belonged to unprotected farming communities and offered protection to the population of the local region in case of a hostile attack, whilst the settlements themselves usually fell victim to plundering and destruction by the aggressors. The large size of refuge castles enabled them to provide stores and supplies in the event of a siege.

Later on during the Middle Ages this type of castle was also built by local farmers. These "farmers' castles" provided protection for country folk from marauding bands of troops. Their fortifications generally had little in common with the castles erected by the nobility as residences, but often consisted just of earthworks and wooden palisades sited in easily defensible locations on hilltops or spurs.

Because the majority of refuge castles were not permanent settlements, archaeological excavations often produce little by way of finds.

In the Middle Ages fortified churches (Wehrkirchen) and fortress churches (Kirchenburgen) also acted as refuge castles. They were primarily utilised as the village churches, but their fortifications also made them suitable for use as temporary places of refuge for the villages. The wall of the churchyard, which was actually designed to protect the cemetery, was upgraded in church castles into a defensible defensive wall (Wehrmauer) and even the church tower could be given a defensive function.

== In Germany ==
- Allersburg near Loiperstätt, between Dorfen and Velden (Vils)
- Amelungsburg (Weser Uplands)
- Amöneburg (Hesse)
- Babilonie (Wiehen Hills)
- Barenburg near Eldagsen
- Borlinghausen
- Büraburg (Hesse)
- Bummannsburg in Bergkamen
- Döben
- Dünsberg (Hessen)
- Eresburg
- Eringaburg
- Eiringsburg south of Bad Kissingen
- Grotenburg (by Hermann's Monument in the Teutoburg Forest)
- Heidenlöcher near Deidesheim
- Heidenschanze near Sievern
- Herlingsburg near Schieder-Schwalenberg
- Hohensyburg in Dortmund-Syburg
- Hünenburg (near Hedemünden)
- Isenburg
- Late Roman hillfort, Katzenberg near Mayen
- Kukesburg
- Monraburg near Großmonra
- Mettermich (Rhön)
- Plößnitz
- Reitlingsbefestigungen
- Ringwall Venne im Kottenforst near Bonn
- Sachsenberg
- Skidroburg in Schieder-Schwalenberg
- Tönsberg (Teutoburg Forest)
- Tüddern
- Wartberg (Heilbronn)
- Wittekindsburg near Porta Westfalica

== In Austria ==
- Refuge castle near Duel/Paternion (Carinthia):

Near the refuge castle on a hillock was a Late Antiquity period castellum built around 400 A. D., which had the task of protecting the road crossing in the Gailtal valley, i.e. it was not primarily designed as a refuge castle. During excavations, as well as the defensive system, an early Christian church was discovered in the interior of the castellum.

- Kreuzen Castle/Bad Kreuzen (Upper Austria)

== See also ==
- Cave castle
- Hillfort
