= Heidkopf =

Heidkopf may refer to:

- Heidkopf (Wiehen Hills), a hill in Minden-Lübbecke district, Germany
- Heidkopf (Spessart), a hill of Bavaria, Germany
