= Egge (Wiehen Hills) =

Coordinates: 52°17′19″N 8°29′23″E

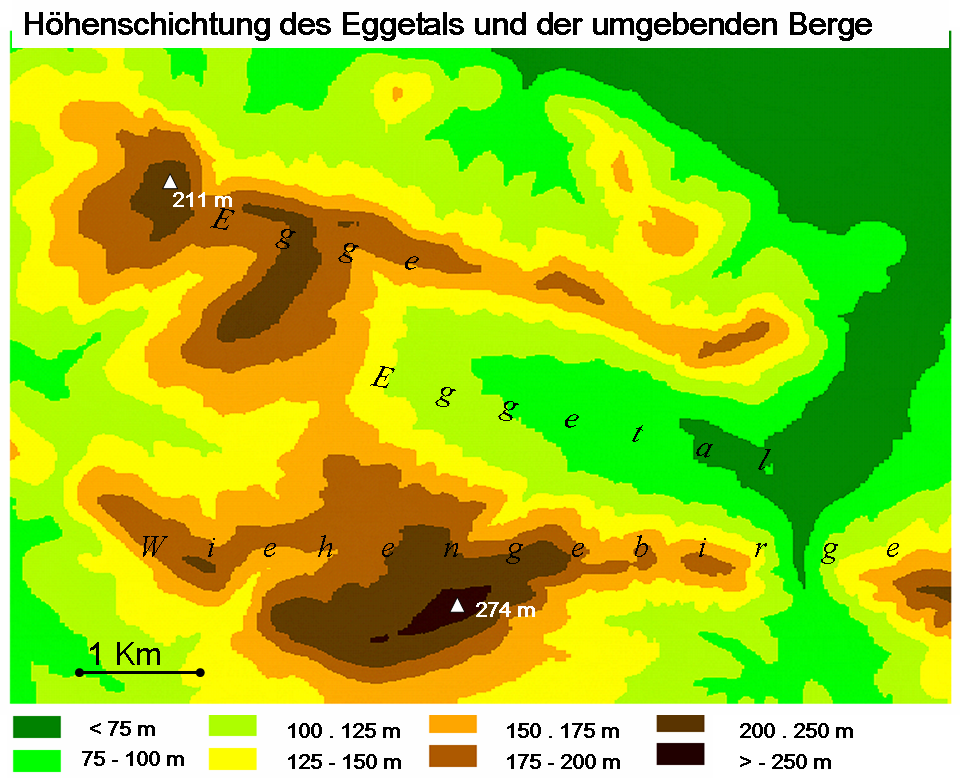
Contour map of the Egge (northernmost ridge)

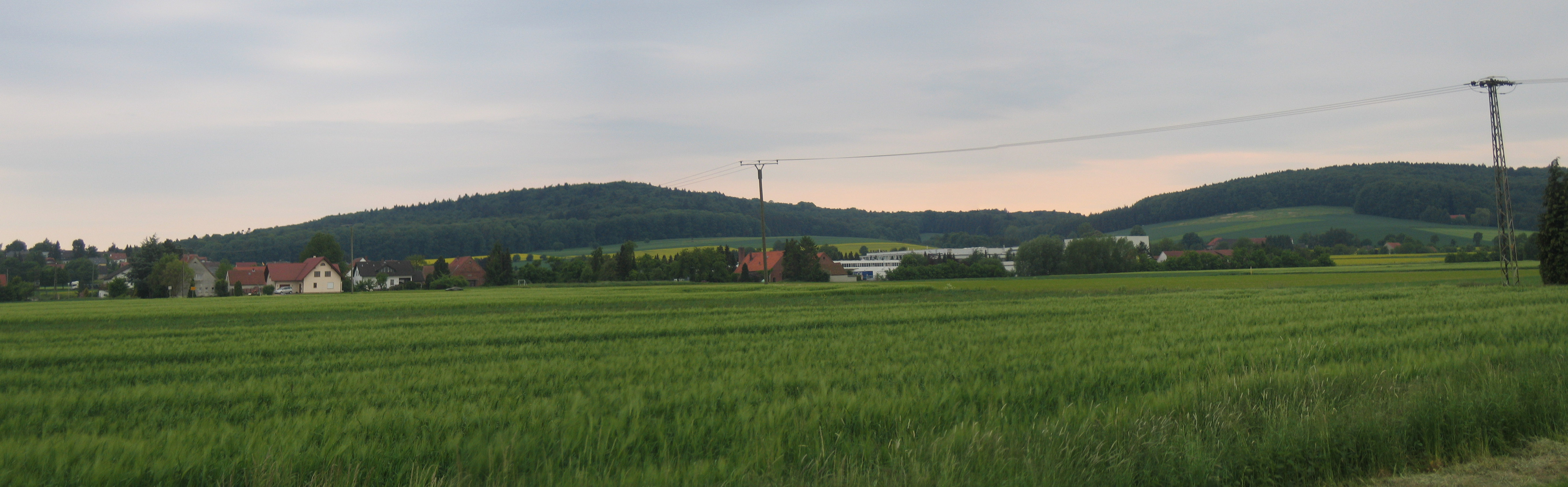
Limberg and Offelter Berg from the south

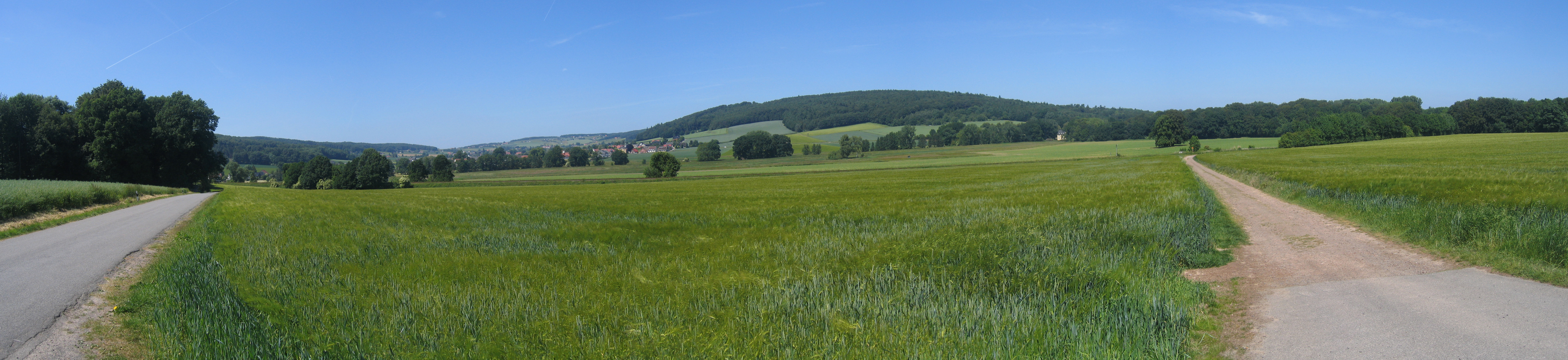
View of the Egge from Glösinghausen. Foreground right: the Limberg. Left: the Eggetal

The Egge (German pronunciation: [ˈɛɡə]), also called the Preußisch Oldendorfer Berg is a roughly seven-kilometre-long secondary ridge of the Wiehen Hills and gives its name to the Eggetal valley in the districts of Osnabrück and Minden-Lübbecke in North Germany. The state border between North Rhine-Westphalia and Lower Saxony divides the ridge at a pass called the Durchbruch ("breakthrough") over which the road from Preußisch Oldendorf runs into the Eggetal and to Bruchmühlen, about two-thirds of the Egge belonging to Westphalia.

In addition to describing the entire ridge, in many maps the Egge is also shown as referring to a summit with a height of 198 m above sea level (NN) north of Eininghausen and east of the Geisberg 201 m above NN; this usage is rare however. The section of the main crest of the Wiehen Hills between Neue Mühle and Horst Höhe is referred in maps as Die Egge ("The Egge").

The ridge runs parallel to the main crest of the Wiehen at a distance of around two to three kilometres from it and between the villages of Lintorf in the borough of Bad Essen and Bad Holzhausen in the borough of Preußisch Oldendorf.

The highest hill on the ridge is the 211-metre-high Schwarzer Brink in the west of the Egge. At the same time there is a parcel of arable land north of Büscherheide that, at 218 metres, is somewhat higher. The best-known hill on the Egge is the Limberg with its castle ruins of the same name that is situated in the far east of the ridge and is a popular tourist destination. Before it to the west is the Balkenkamp, a large, cleared upland over which runs a road link from the landwehr to the B 65 federal road to Börninghausen.

The steep northern slopes of the Eggen are predominantly forested; the woods cover an area of around 1,300 hectares. Whilst in the north the forest boundary extends as low as 70 m above NN in places, the southern slopes with their more suitable gentler slopes enable their cultivation up to an average of around 150 metres and, in places, 200 metres. The Wiehen Tower near the state border is a well known observation tower. The eastern part of the Egge belongs to the Limberg und Offelter Berg Nature Reserve.

The summits of the Egge have, like almost all the hills in the Wiehen, an elongated crest, which are also called Eggen like the peak of Gipfel Egge (198 m above NN) north of Eininghausen. These Eggen are separated from one another only by hill passes called Dören. The clearly defined crests may have derived their names for the formerly common description of Eggem meaning "selvage", the edge of a strip of linen.

The pass above the town of Preußisch Oldendorf for the aforementioned north-south link, the Kreisstraße 79, is an artificial Döre, cut 9 metres deep into the rock. The road and cutting were carried out as emergency work from 1924 to 1927. This road link, which replaced the historical Eininghauser Patt, is called Eininghauser Weg and runs through Oldendorf Switzerland, explains the steep climb just before the heights of the Egge.
