= Babilonie =

Iron age hillfort

- Bodendenkmal Babilonie
- Obermehnen in the Wiehen
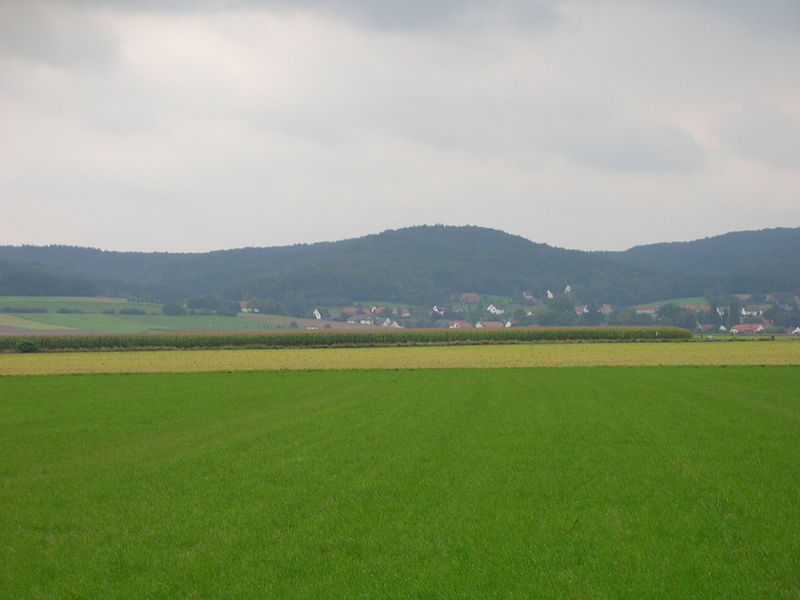
- Babilonie above Obermehnen

Site information
- Type: hill castle
- Code: DE-NW
- Condition: double rampart system, earthwork

Location
- Coordinates: 52°16′36″N 8°34′36″E
- Height: 255 m above sea level (NHN)

Site history
- Built: 300-150 B.C.
- Materials: Wooden posts and palisade protected by an earthwork

Garrison information
- Occupants: no categorisation

The Babilonie is a hillfort of the La Tène culture at a height of 255.6 metres above sea level on the northern edge of a rounded hill in the Wiehen Hills above the Lübbecke village of Obermehnen in the district of Minden-Lübbecke in the German state of North Rhine-Westphalia. The name is derived from the Germanic baben in the lon i.e. "up in the woods".

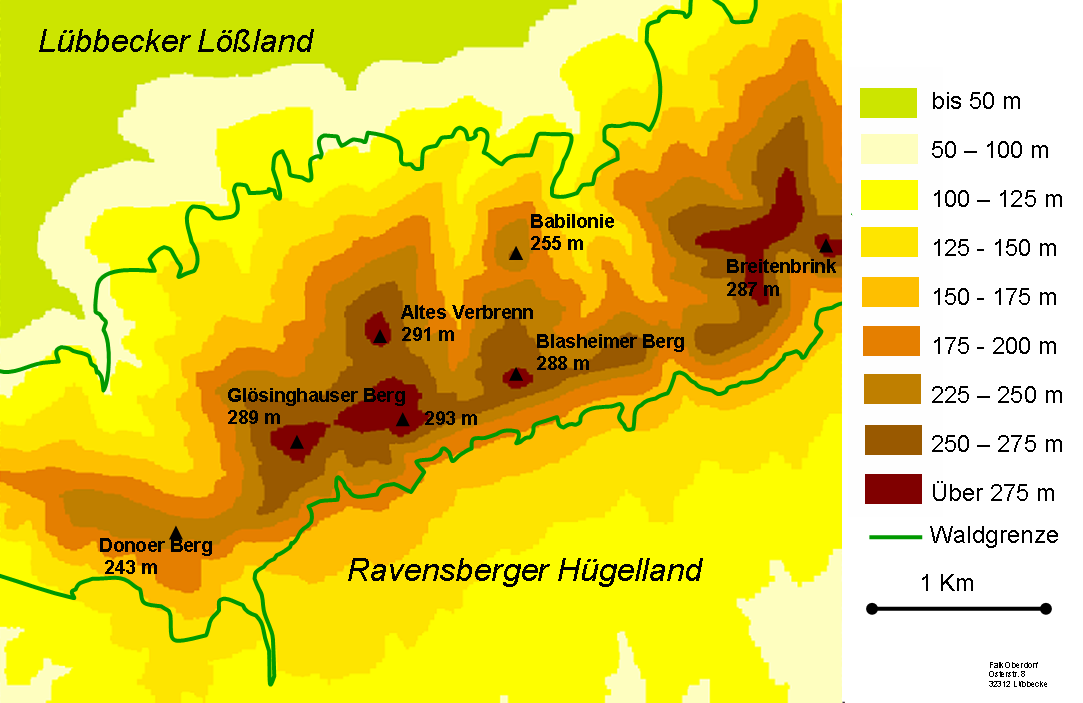
Relief map of the Wiehen around the Babilonie

The wedge-shaped, double-rampart system, which descends from south to north with the slope, was investigated archaeologically in the first half of the last century, especially by Friedrich Langewiesche, who assessed it as a refuge castle.

Ceramic and even metalwork finds indicate that it belongs to the La Tène culture in the pre-Roman Iron Age, e vorrömische Eisenzeit, therefore probably part of an extensive trading network. The fortification has an area of over 12 hectares. The first mapping of this hilltop, which was exceptionally well-suited to the establishment of a large hillfort with its spring high up the hills, was carried out after 1880.

Ceramic finds from the Saxon-Frankish period have also been discovered.

According to Paul Höfer there is a legend that refers to Wittekind.

== Sources ==
- Torsten Capelle: Wallburgen in Westfalen-Lippe. Herausgegeben von der Altertumskommission für Westfalen, Münster, 2010, ISSN 0939-4745, p. 22f. No. FBW 12 (Frühe Burgen in Westfalen Sonderband 1)
