= Kahle Wart =

Coordinates: 52°16′10″N 8°35′40″E

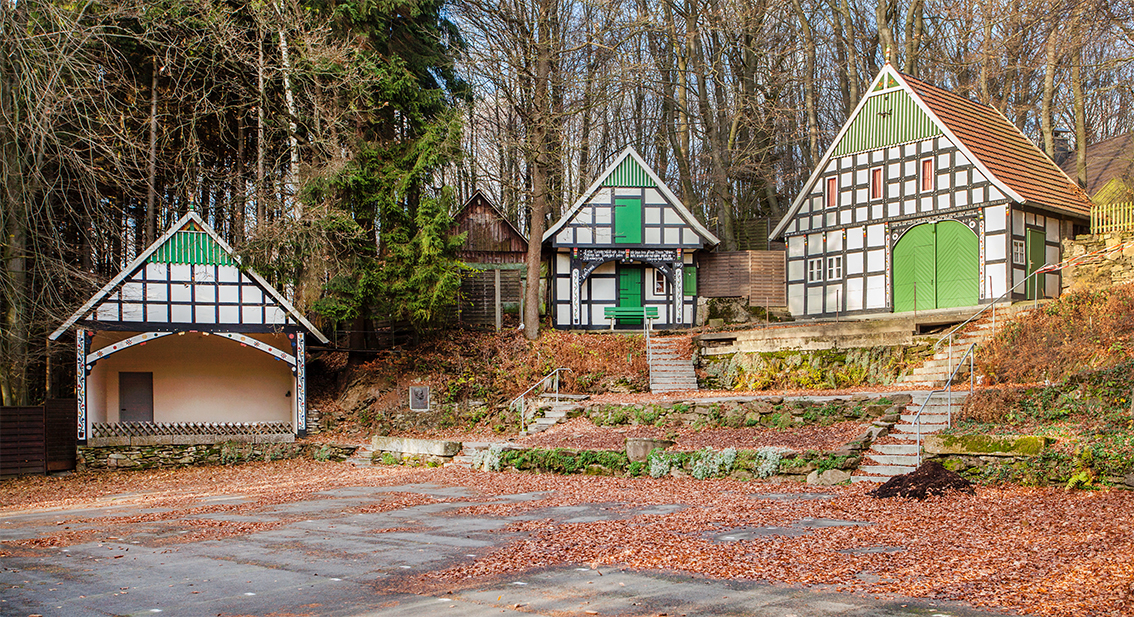
The stage

Kahle Wart is an open-air theatre in Oberbauerschaft (part of Hüllhorst), North Rhine-Westphalia, Germany.

They act plays in German and Low German. Three plays are performed each year: a High German play (beginning of June to mid-July), a Low German play (mid-July to end of August) and – since 2017 – also a family play.

The theatre is named after the summit Kahlewart of the Wiehen Hills. The Wittekindsweg, which leads from Osnabrück to Porta Westfalica and has a length of about 95 kilometres, runs across the site.

== History ==
The stage consists of a collection of half-timbered houses and was inaugurated on 6 June 1948 with a concert by the village's band, a group of recorder players and the folk dance group. The first theatre performance was on 13 June 1948 with the Low German play “Wenn de Hahn kreiht” (When the cock crows).

== Sources ==
- Freilichtbühne Kahle Wart
