= Schwarzer Brink =

Hill in Lower Saxony, Germany

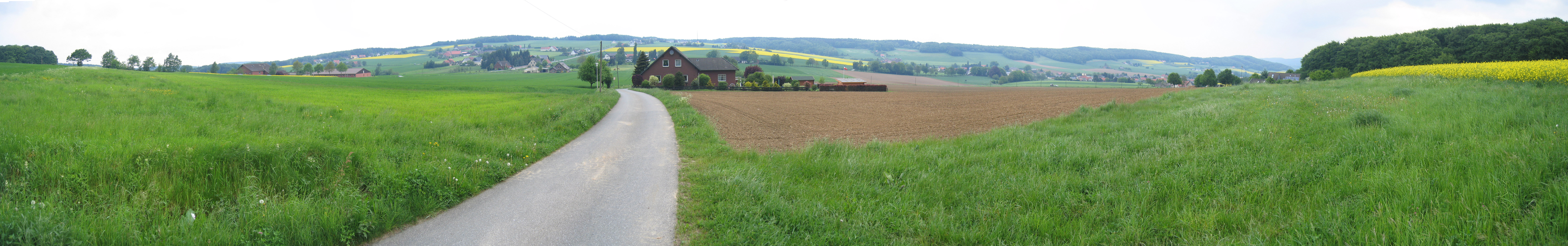
- The Schwarzer Brink seen from Gehle

Highest point
- Elevation: 211 m (692 ft)
- Coordinates: 52°17′28″N 8°26′45″E

Geography
- Location within Lower Saxony
- Parent range: Wiehen Hills

The Schwarzer Brink is a hill in the Egge, a side ridge of the Wiehen Hills in North Germany. It is 211 metres high and is often cited as the highest hill in the Egge. At the same time there is in the immediate vicinity, around a kilometre southwest of the hill, north of Büscherheide an arable area, that is somewhat higher, but does not bear its own name. Because that field lies 200 metres west of the state border with North Rhine-Westphalia, and thus on the territory of Bad Essen, the Schwarzer Brink not even the highest point in its own municipality. Around 500 metres north of the Schwarzer Brink is the Hartmann Hut.

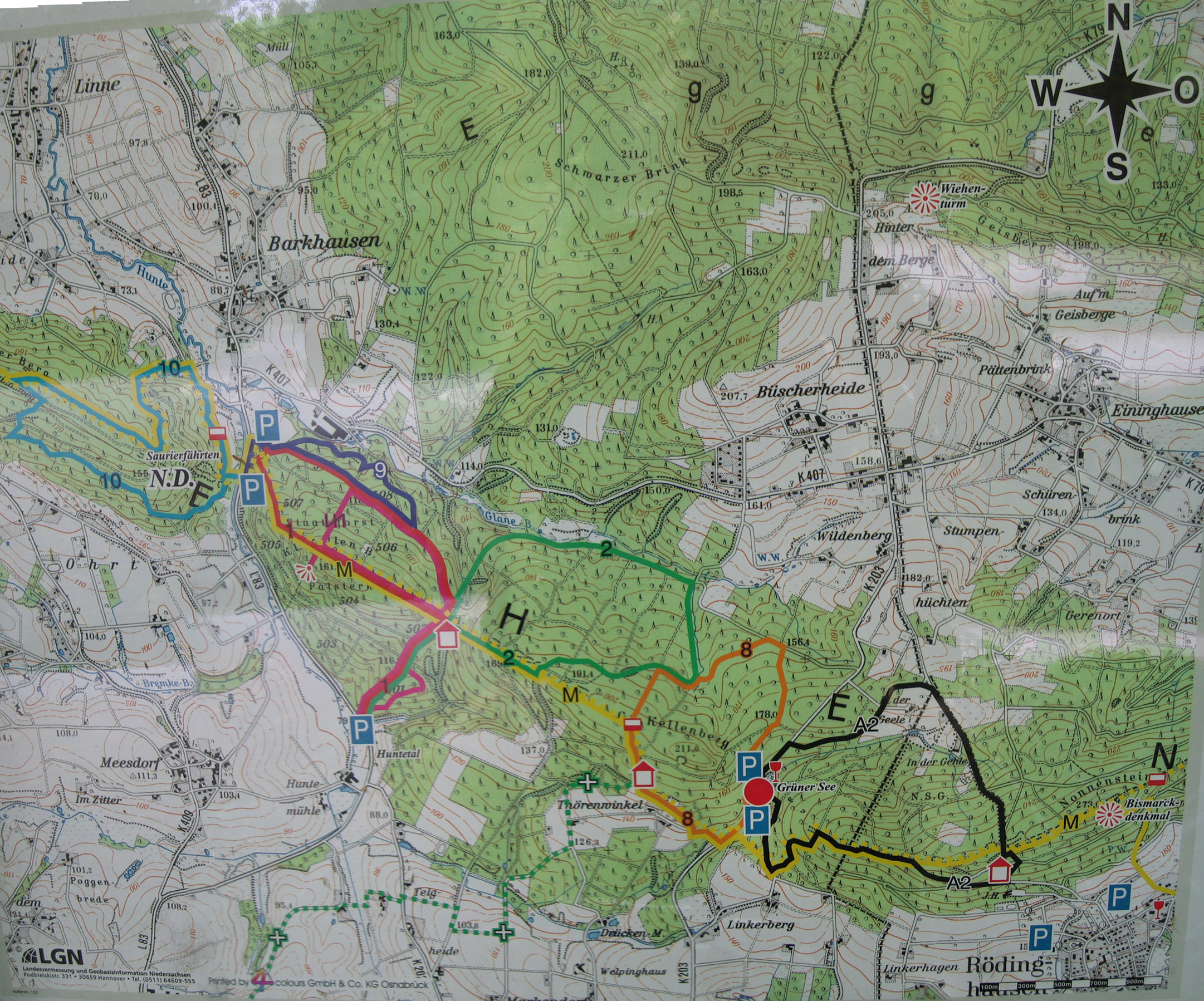
The Schwarzer Brink is situated in the northern part of this map. However, the highest point in the area is unnamed and lies on arable land immediately above the word "Büscherheide".
