= Schleptruper Egge =

- Location within Lower Saxony

Highest point
- Elevation: 148 m above sea level (NHN) (486 ft)
- Listing: Schleptruper Egge Transmitter
- Coordinates: 52°22′27″N 8°01′52″E

Geography
- Location: Bramsche
- Parent range: Wiehen Hills

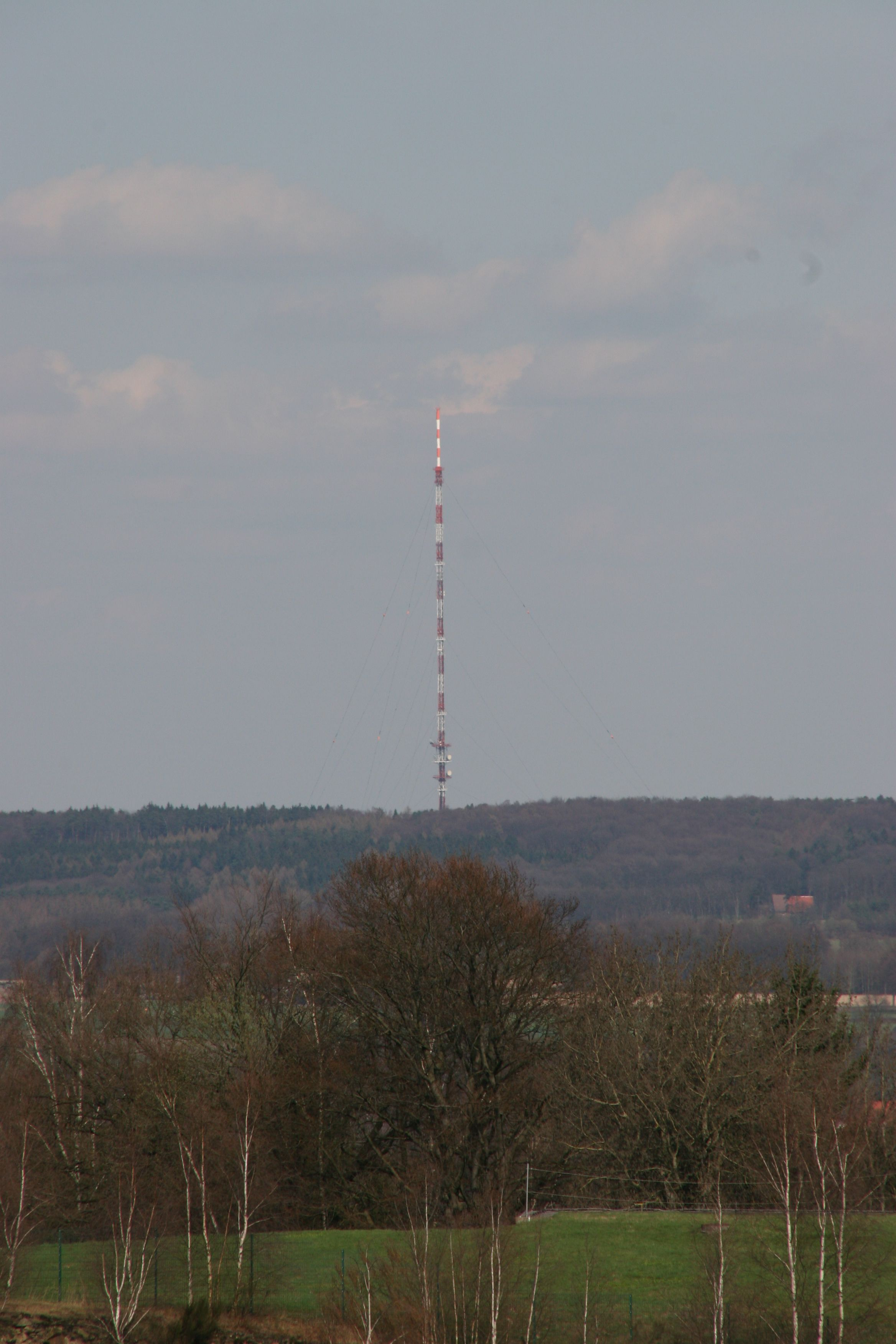
The landmark on the Schleptruper Egge is the over-230-metre-high mast of the NDR Osnabrück-Engter Transmitter

The Schleptruper Egge is a 148-m high hill in the Bramsche parish of Schleptrup and is part of the Wiehen Hills. To the north is the bog of Großes Moor at a height of about 47 m above sea level (NHN), the Mittelland Canal built in the 20th century and the Bramsche parish of Kalkriese. Immediately east of the Schleptruper Egge runs the A 1 motorway, the so-calle Hanseatic Line (Hansalinie).

On the top of the Schleptruper Egge is the mast of the NDR Osnabrück-Engter Transmitter. The long distance path of Hünenweg, managed by the Weser-Ems Wiehen Hills Society (Wiehengebirgsverband Weser-Ems), which runs from Osnabrück to Papenburg, also leads over the Schleptruper Egge.
