= Heidkopf (Spessart) =

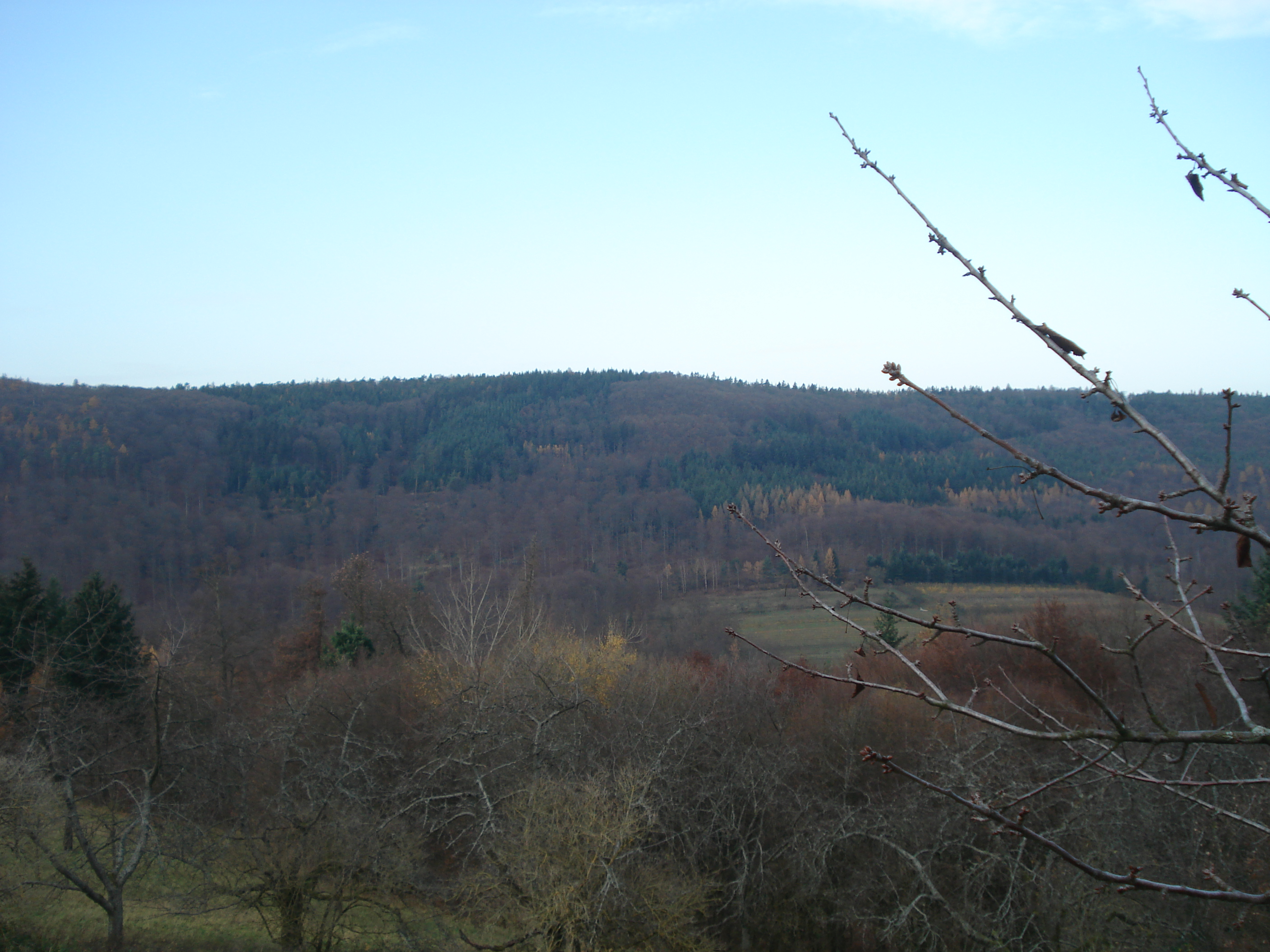
- Heidkopf viewed from the southeast

Highest point
- Elevation: 371 m (1,217 ft)
- Coordinates: 50°06′16″N 9°08′58″E

Geography
- Location within Bavaria
- Location: Bavaria, Germany
- Parent range: Spessart

Heidkopf (Spessart) is a wooded hill of Bavaria, Germany, located in the Mittelgebirge Spessart.

It reaches an elevation of up to 372 metres above NHN. The peak lies in the district of Aschaffenburg/Bavaria, but the border to Hesse passes over the hill, so part of it lies in the Main-Kinzig-Kreis.
