= Mettermich =

Coordinates: 50°17′N 9°50′E

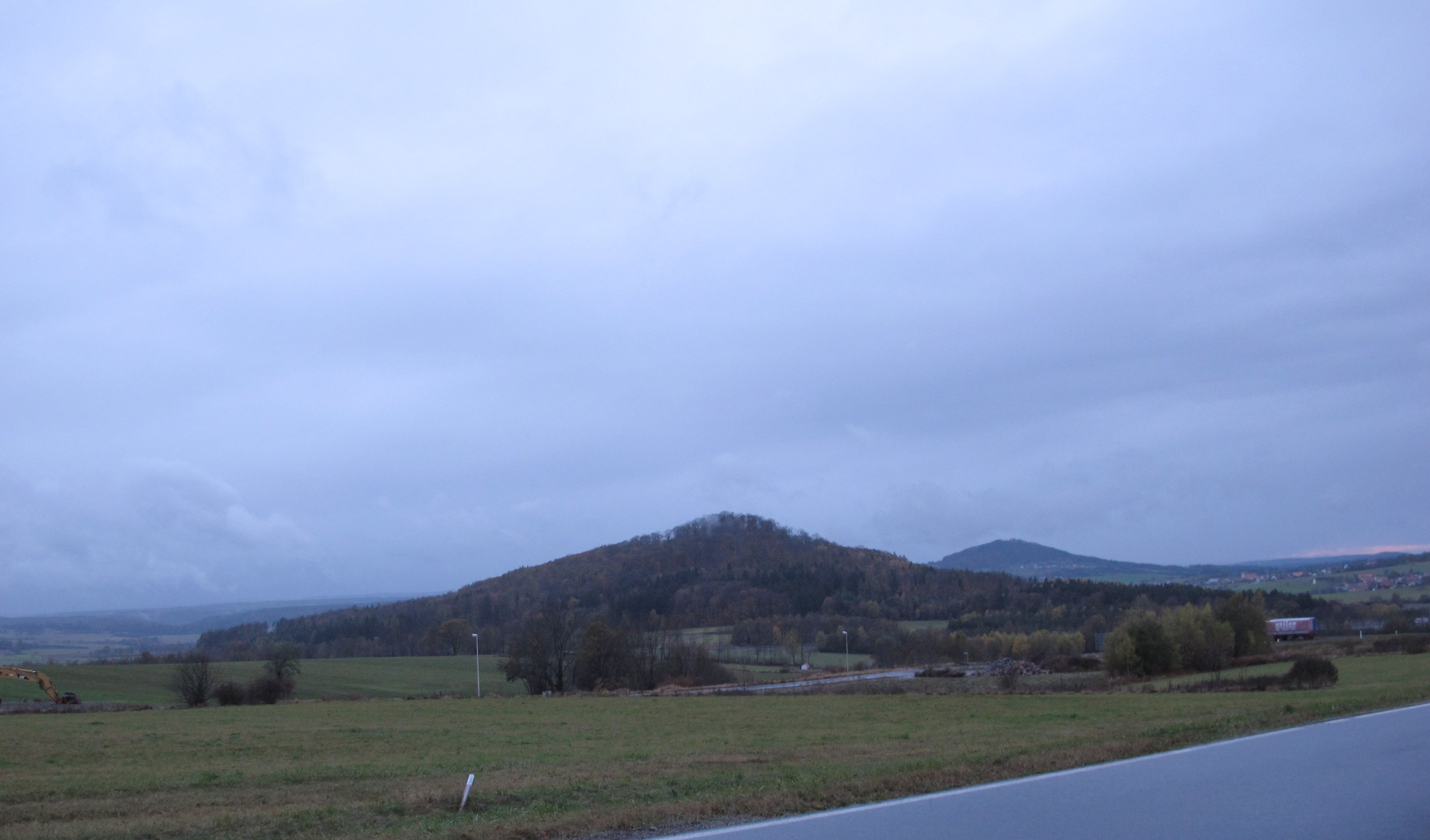
- Mettermich and Dreistelzberg seen from Schildeck

Highest point
- Elevation: 585 m (1,919 ft)

Geography
- Location: Bavaria, Germany

Mettermich is a mountain of Bavaria, Germany.
