= Wiehen Hills =

Hill range in North Rhine-Westphalia and Lower Saxony in Germany

Wiehen Hills (Wiehengebirge)
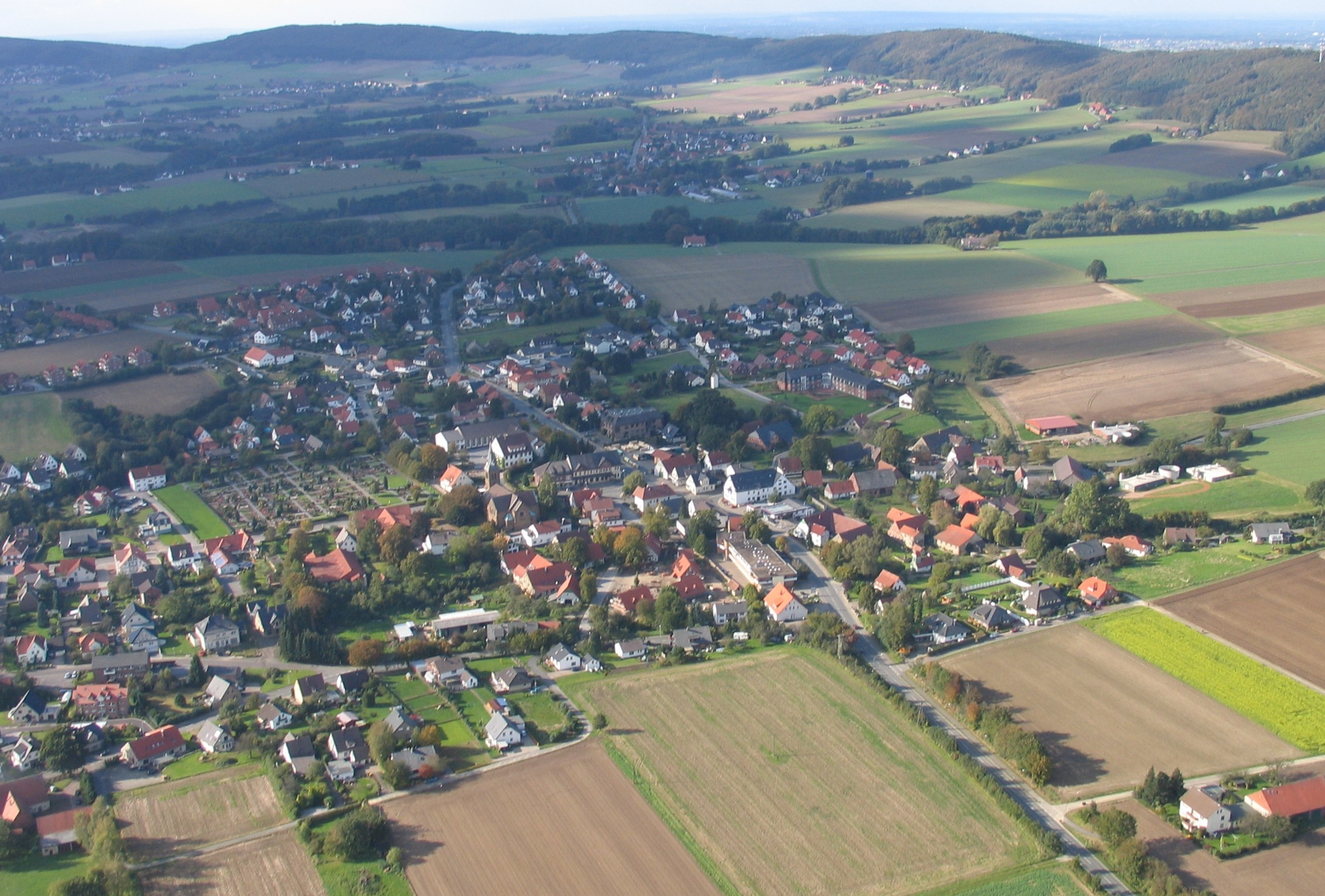
- The Wiehen Hills near Schnathorst, seen from the southeast

Highest point
- Peak: Heidbrink
- Elevation: 320 m (1,050 ft)

Dimensions
- Length: 70 km (43 mi)

Geography
- Location within North Rhine-Westphalia
- State: Lower Saxony/North Rhine-Westphalia
- Range coordinates: 52°17′42″N 8°38′12″E
- Parent range: Lower Saxon Hills

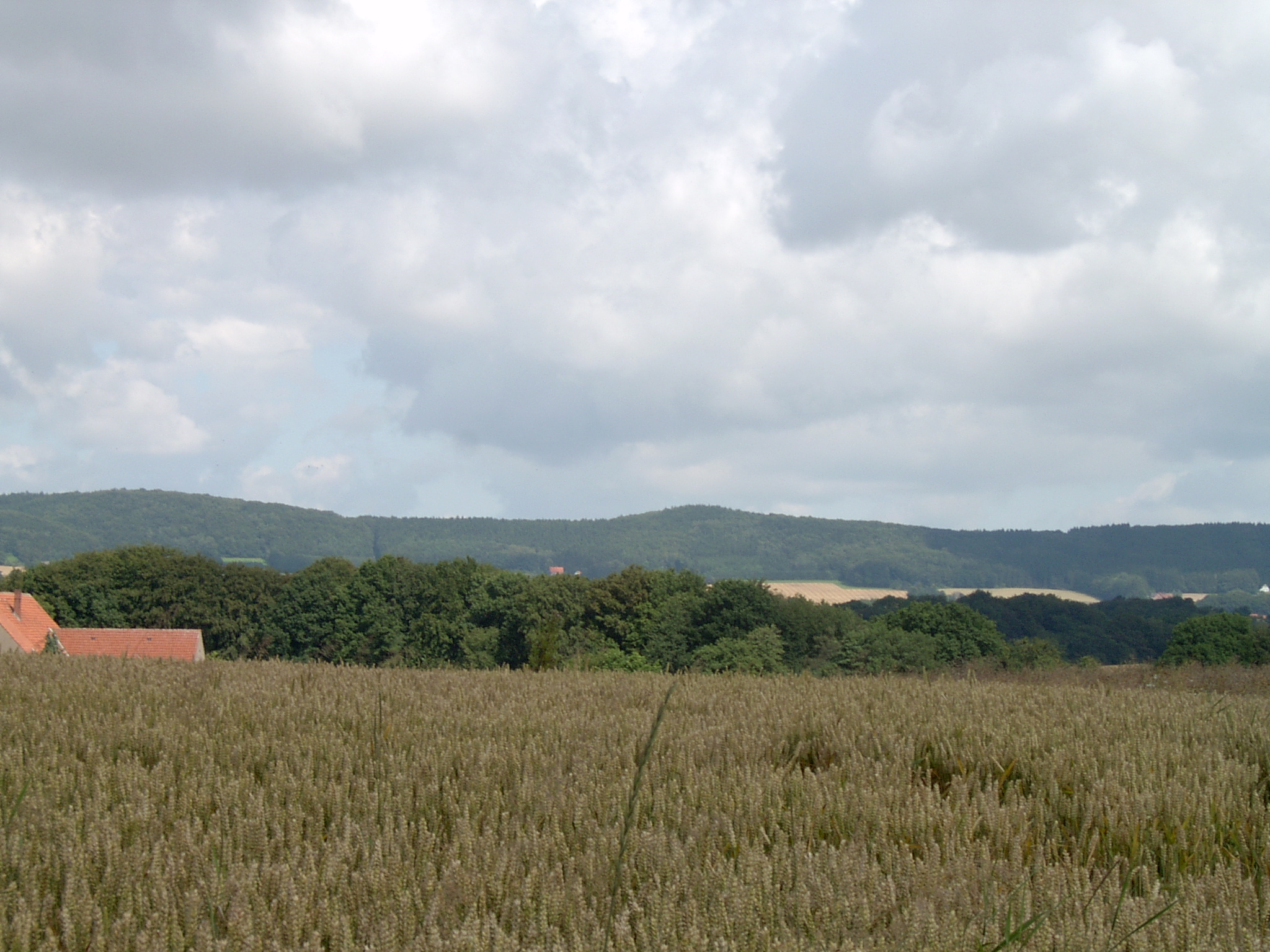
Wiehen Hills

The Wiehen Hills (German: Wiehengebirge, pronounced [ˈviːənɡəˌbɪʁɡə], also locally, just Wiehen) are a hill range in North Rhine-Westphalia and Lower Saxony in Germany. The hills run from west to east like a long finger away from the main upland area of the Lower Saxon Hills, beginning at the Weser River near Minden and terminating in the vicinity of Osnabrück. It is the northernmost of the German Central Upland ranges extending into the Northern Lowlands. Their highest hill is the Heidbrink near Lübbecke with an altitude of 320 metres (1,050 ft).

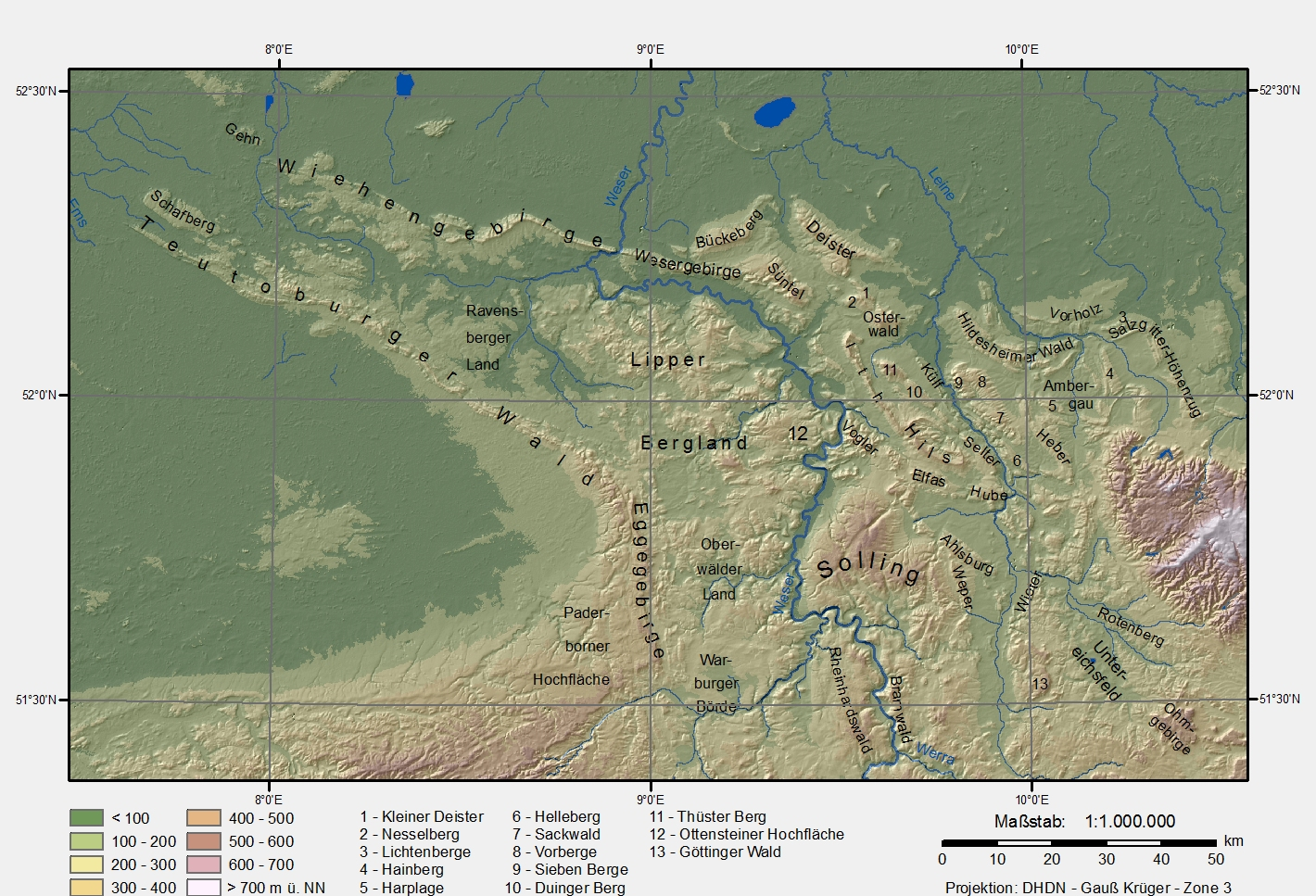
Location of the Wiehen Hills in the Lower Saxon Hills. It is easy to see that it forms a single geomorphological unit with the Gehn, Weser Hills and Süntel. As the map clearly shows, the Wiehen Hills are the northernmost finger of the main body of the German Central Uplands. By contrast, other groups of "real" hills (excluding moraines), such as the Stemmer Berge or the Rehburger Berge at the upper edge of the map not far from the lakes of the Dümmer and Steinhuder Meer, lie like islands in the North German Plain.

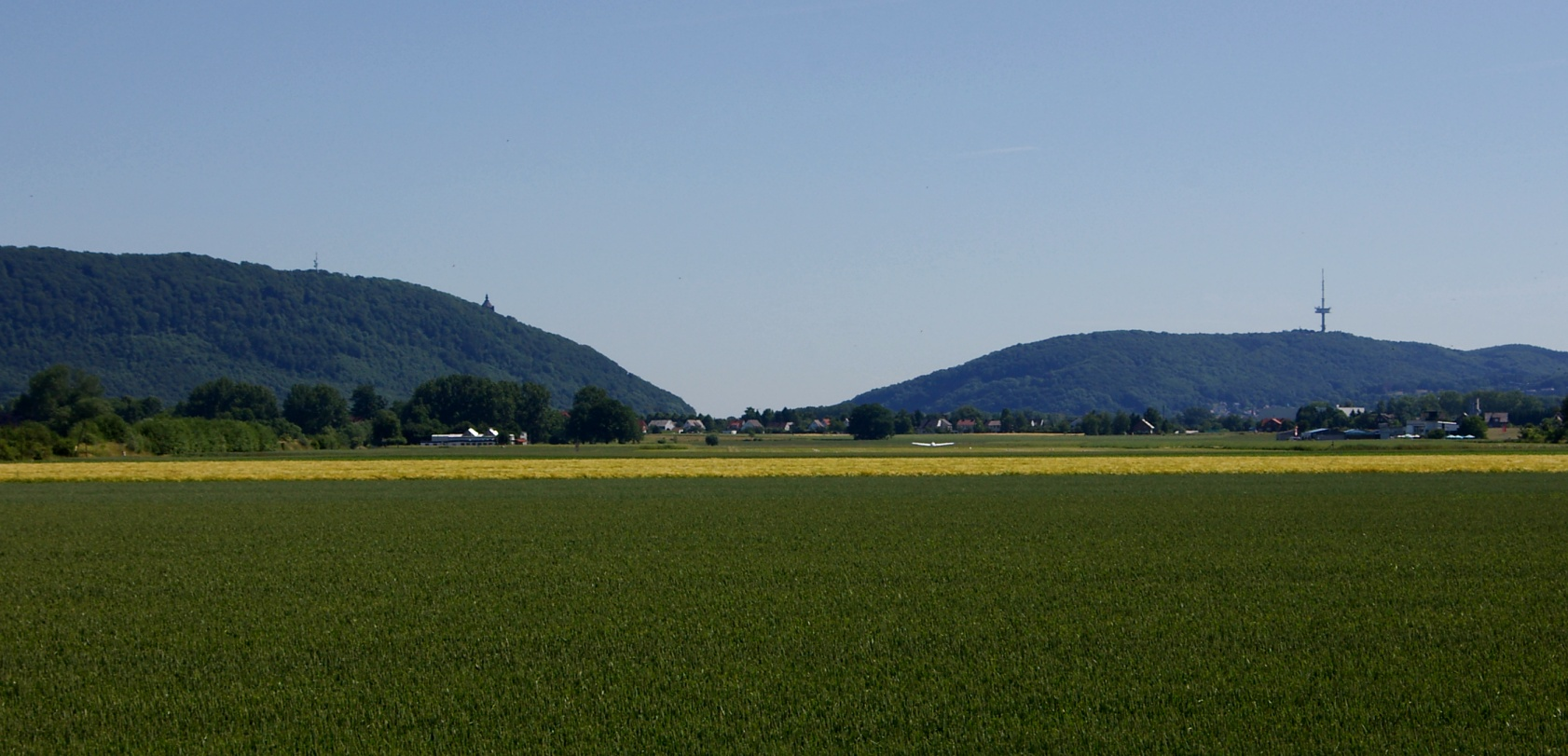
The Porta Westfalica defines the eastern end of the Wiehen Hills (left). To the east, on the other side of the Weser, the hills continue as the Wesergebirge (right).

== Location ==
The Wiehen Hills lie within the districts of Osnabrück, Minden-Lübbecke and Herford. Their northern section runs in an east–west direction roughly from the territory of Bramsche (northwest of Osnabrück) via Ostercappeln, Bad Essen, Preußisch Oldendorf and Rödinghausen, Lübbecke, Hüllhorst and Bad Oeynhausen as far as the towns of Minden and Porta Westfalica on the Porta Westfalica gorge and River Weser. They also graze Bohmte and Hille to the north. South of the Wiehen Hills lie Osnabrück, Bissendorf, Melle, Kirchlengern, Bünde, Löhne and Bad Oeynhausen. The Wiehen Hills form the northwestern boundary of the Lower Saxon Hills to which they belong geographically, together with the Westphalian part of the ridge. Whilst the eastern end of the hill chain is clearly defined by the Porta Westfalica gorge and the hill of Wittekindsberg, this is not so simple for its western extremity. To the west the Wiehen descends gradually, transitioning from a hilly ridge into a chain of hillocks and then descending almost imperceptibly into the plain. South of Bramsche the ridge rises again at the Penter Egge to a height of 99 metre, but 2.5 km further west it reaches the level of the surrounding countryside. The waterways of the Mittelland Canal and Osnabrück Canal running away to the south appear to mark the end of the hill range, but west of these canals is the 82-metre-high Larberger Egge which forms the westernmost cornerstone of the Wiehen Hills, rising just 2 km northeast of the boundary with the province of Münster.

To the north, the Wiehen descends to the North German Plain into a region known as the Lübbecke Loessland. On the banks of the Weser, opposite Porta Westfalica, lies the Wesergebirge, which is the eastern continuation of the Wiehen Hills. This ridge is of similar geological construction and runs as far as the area of Hessisch Oldendorf to the Süntel hills. Southeast of the Wiehen Hills are the Lippe Uplands, to the south the Ravensberg Hills, to the southwest in the area of the Tecklenburg Land are the northern foothills of the Teutoburg Forest, and to the northwest are the hills of the Gehn and the Ankum Heights, the Damme Hills and the Stemweder Berg. North of the northwestern tip of the Wiehen liest the great bog of the Großes Moor.

== Hills ==
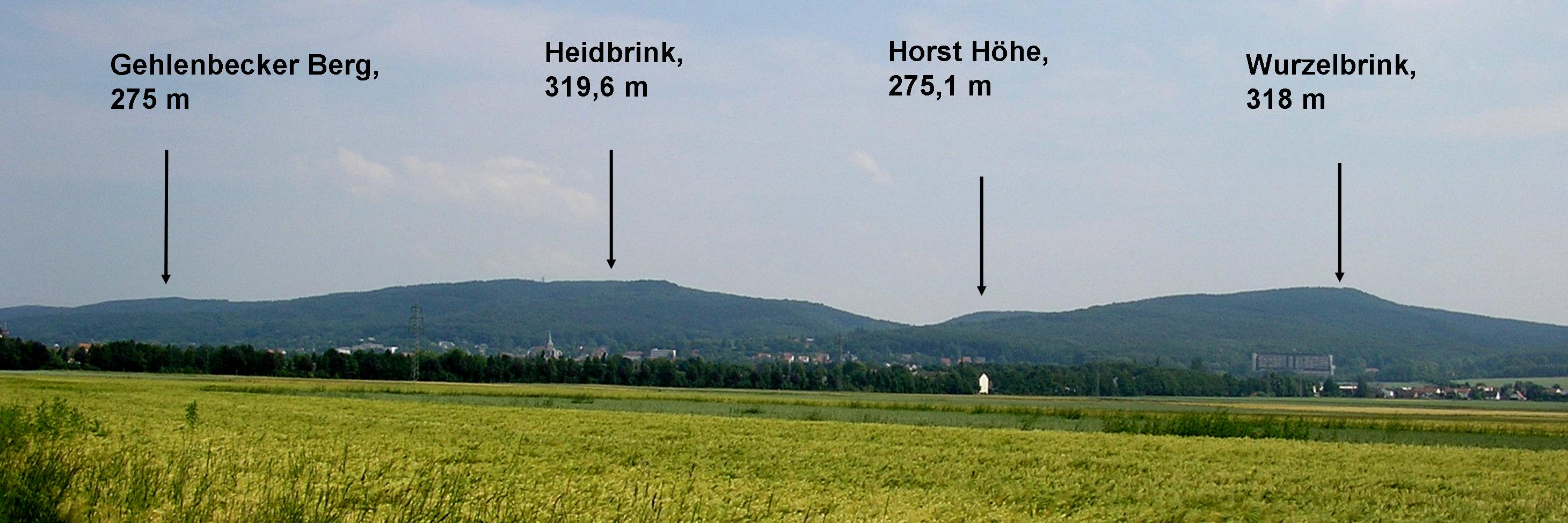
Southern view near Lübbecke

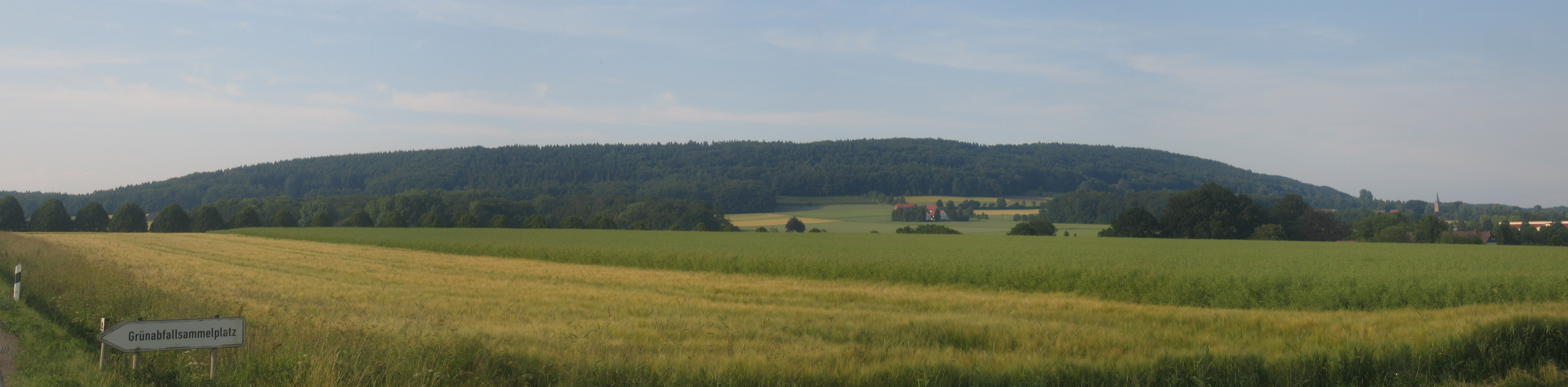
For a long time seen as the highest point – the 274 m high Nonnenstein

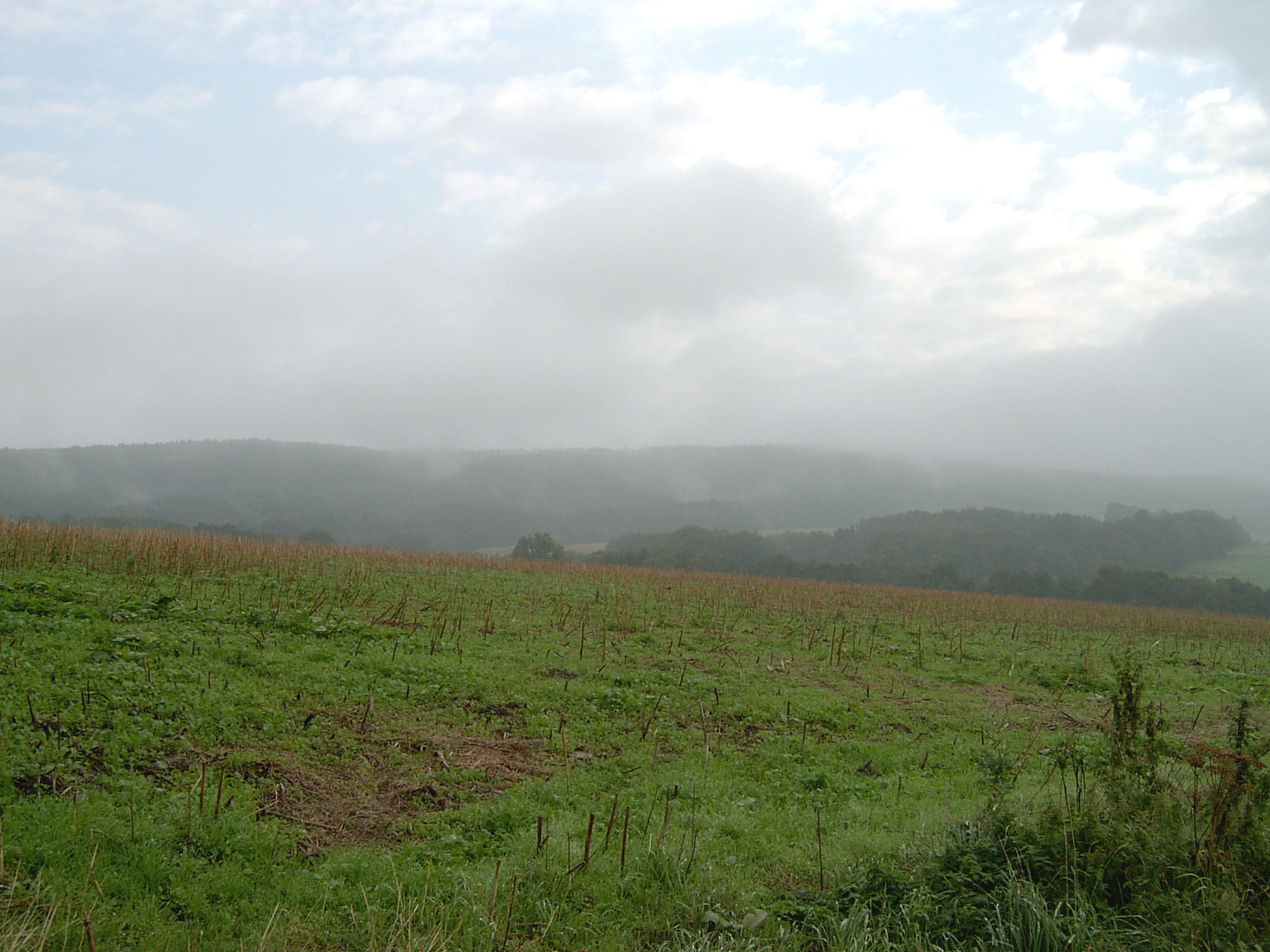
The Wiehen Hills in the fog

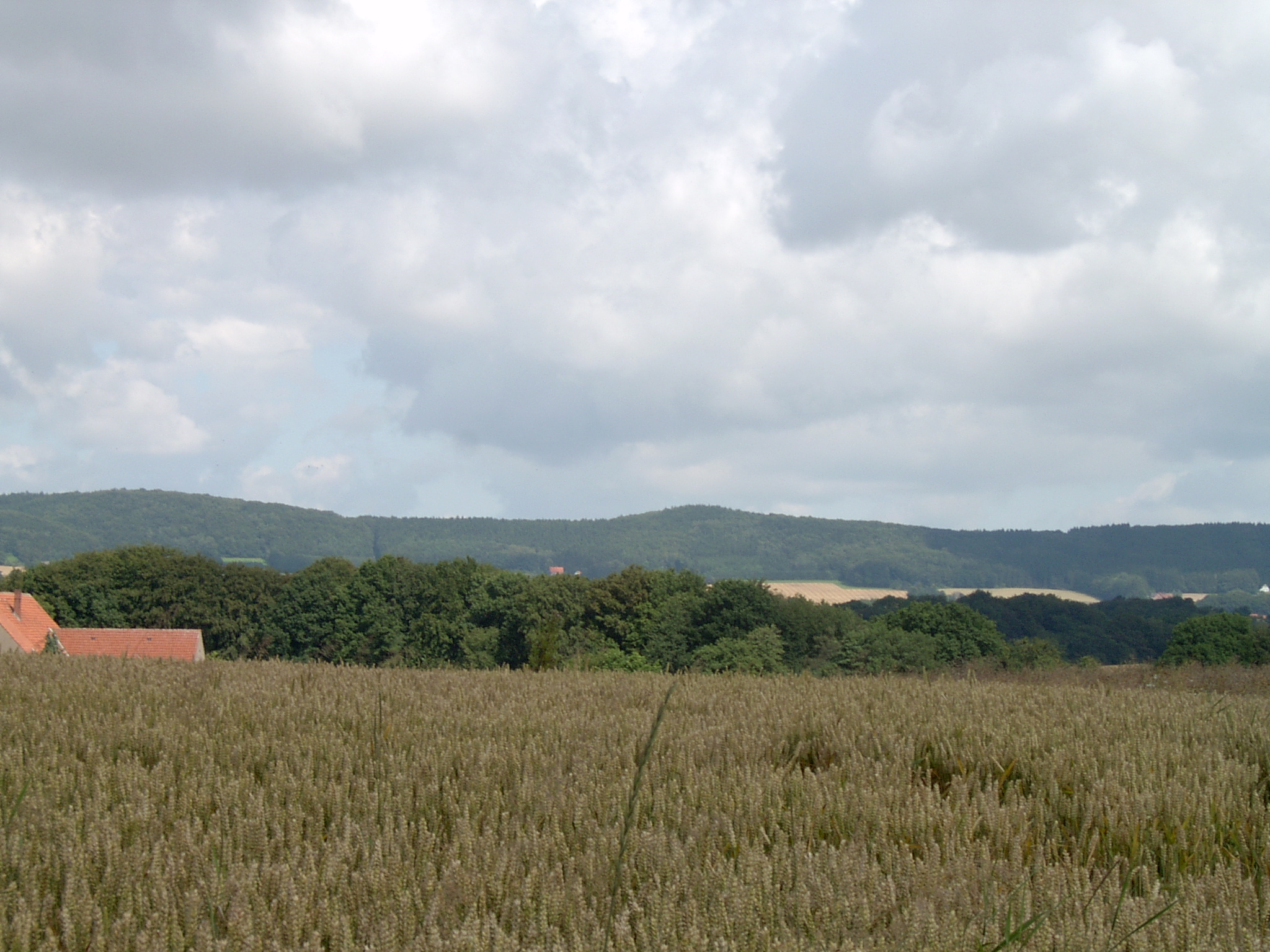
The Wiehen Hills seen from Bünde

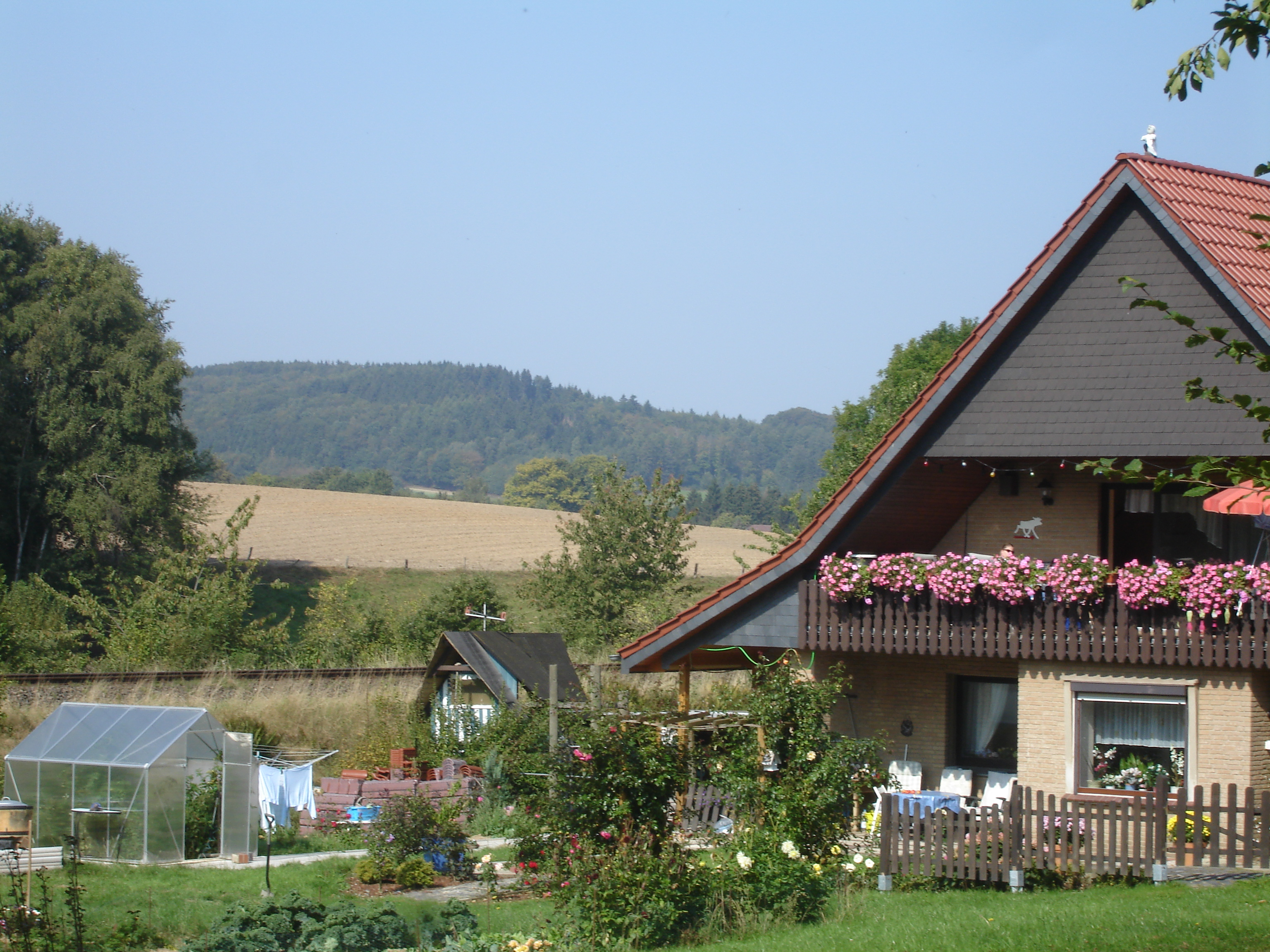
In the Wiehen Hills near Rödinghausen

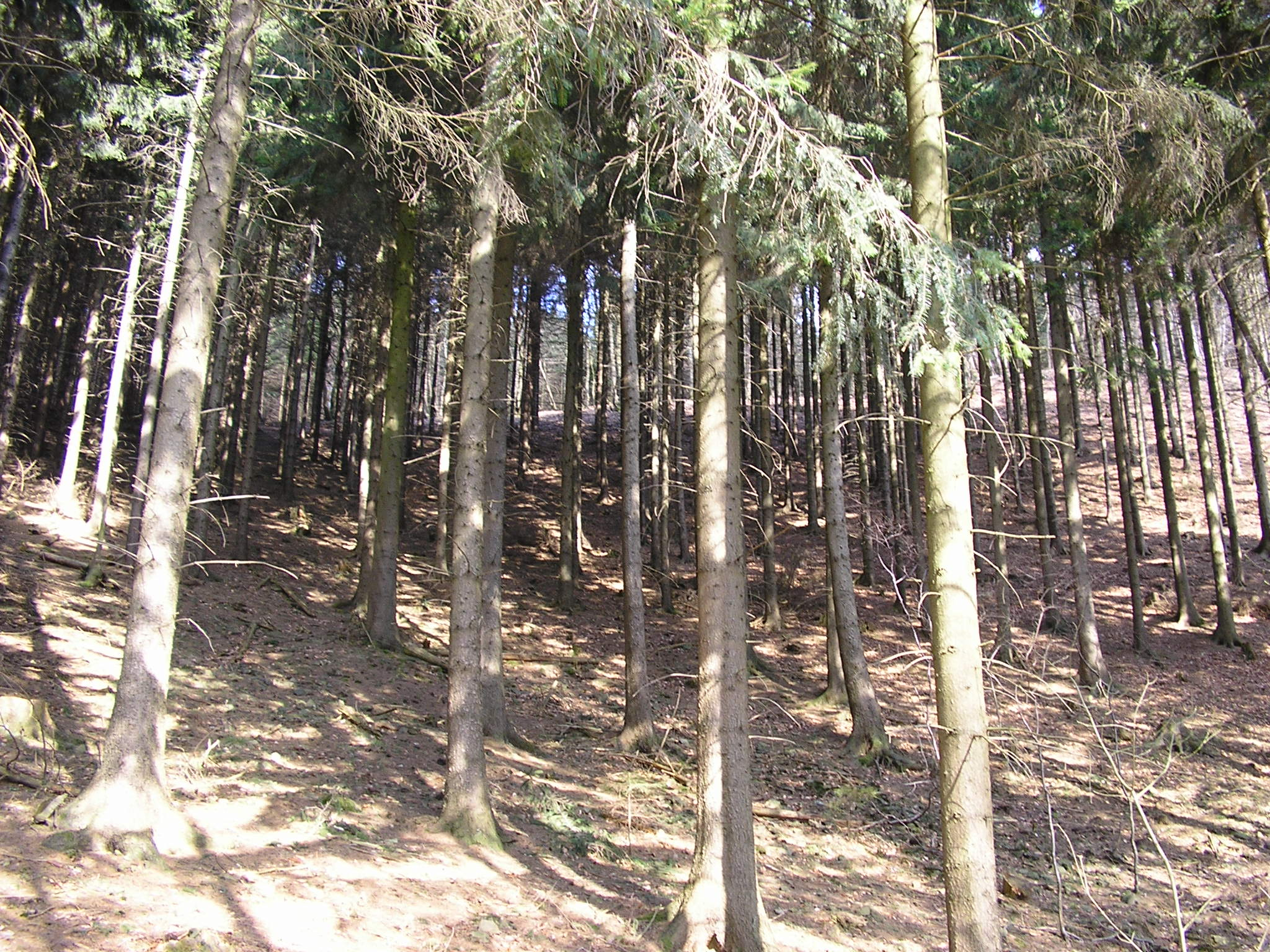
The hill forest of the Wiehen, here on the western slopes of the Wurzelbrink

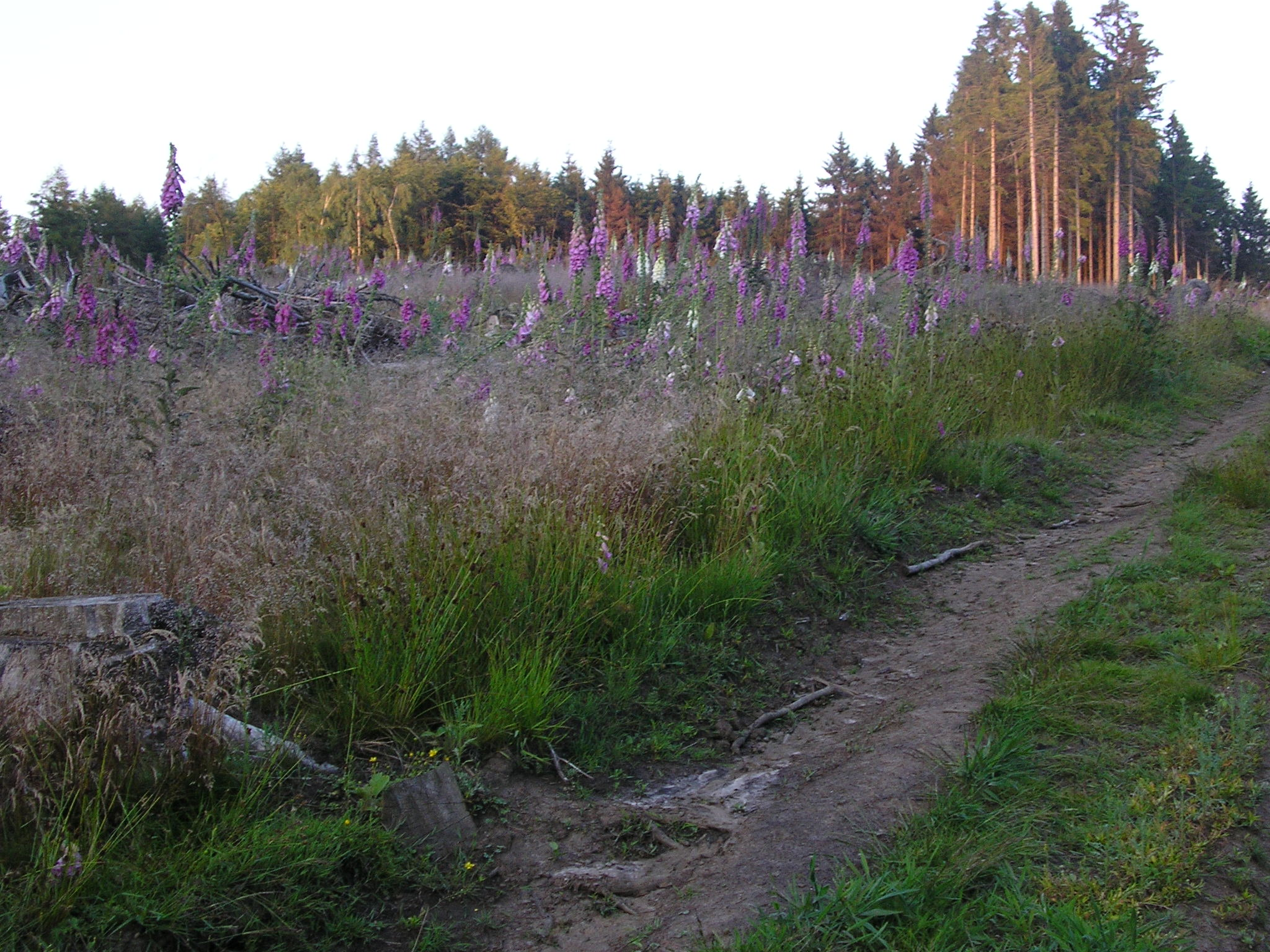
On the summit area of the Kniebrink

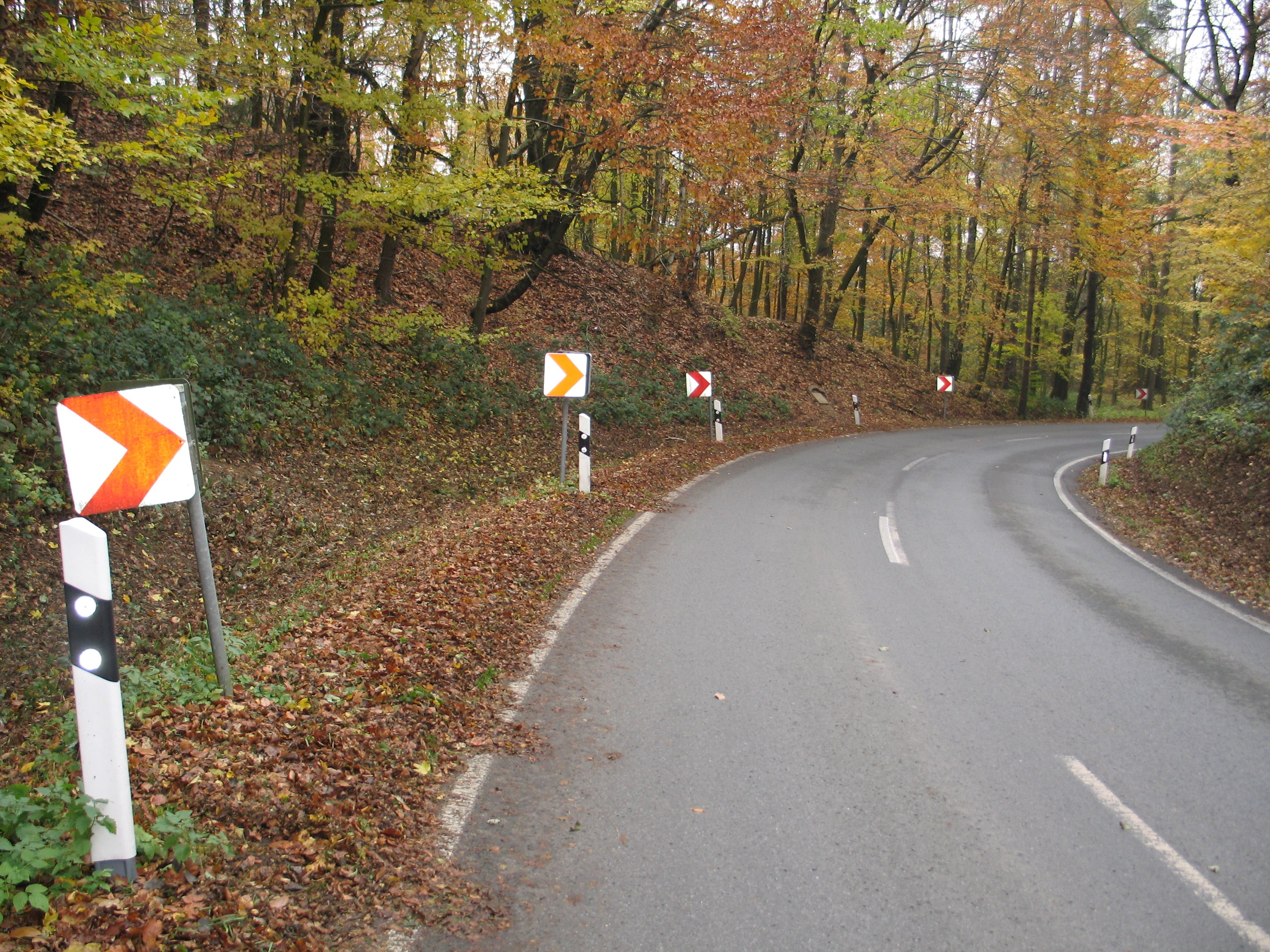
Kreisstraße 79 near the Wiehen Tower at the Egge water gap (autumn 2008); built during RAD emergency work (1924–1927); looking north

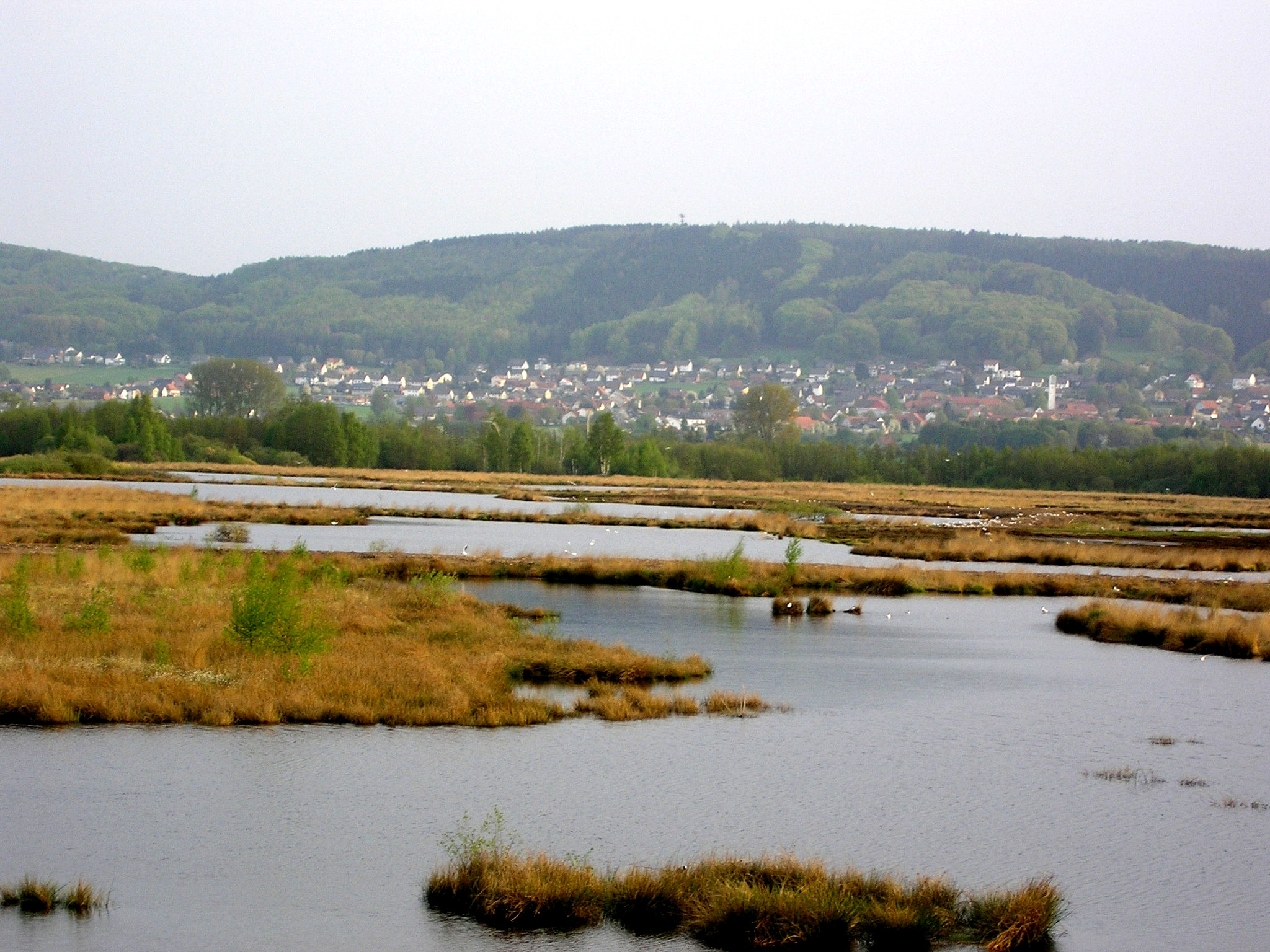
View of the Nettelstedter Berg from the north. from the Großes Torfmoor ("Great Peat Bog")

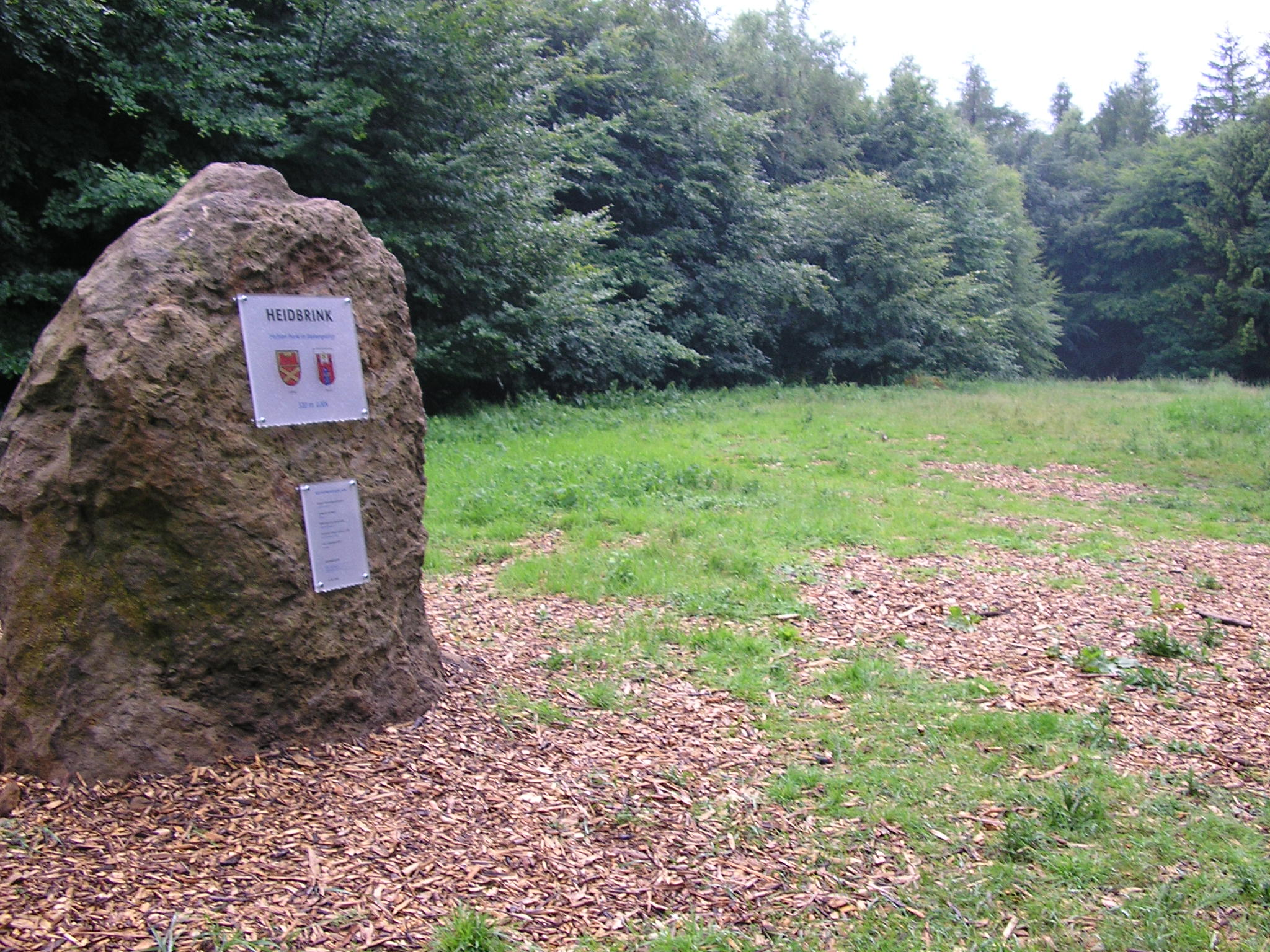
The summit of the highest hill, the Heidbrink

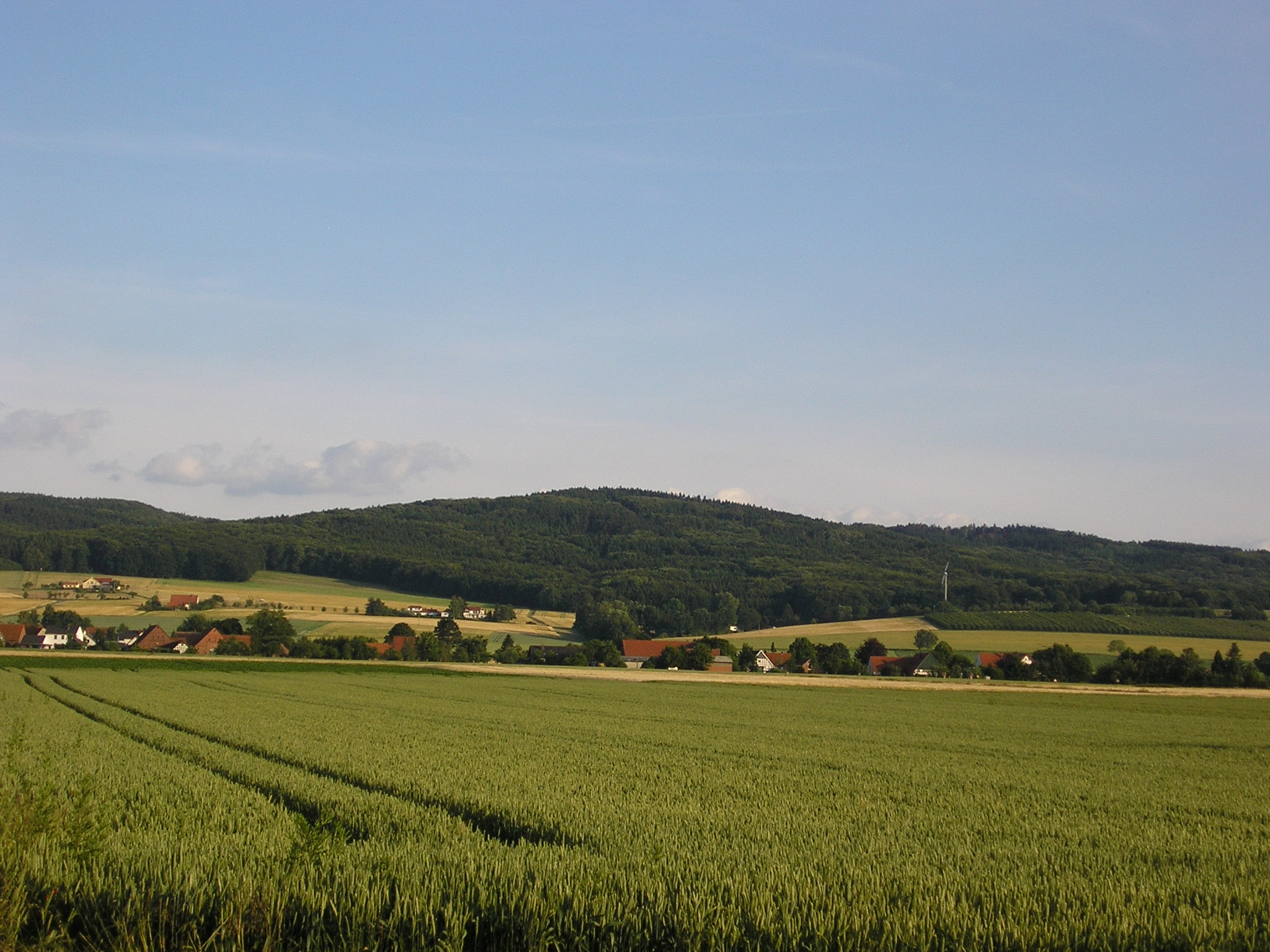
The Wiehen Hills near Bad Holzhausen

The hills of the Wiehen range from west to east are:

Height of the highest hill in bold; heights in metres (m) above Normalhöhennull (NHN)

Description	Height	Commune	Remarks/Description of the location
Larberger Egge	82	Bramsche	westernmost spur of the Wiehen Hills
Schleptruper Egge	148	Bramsche	Transmission site; southeast of Bramsche-Schleptrup
Kalkrieser Berg also: Schmittenhöhe	157	Bramsche	Castle of Alt Barenaue nearby; north of Bramsche-Engter
Venner Egge	158	Ostercappeln	Near Ostercappeln-Vehrte
Stenshöhe	149	Belm	Süntelstein rock
Sonnenbrink	177	Bad Essen	Sonnenbrink Tower (communications tower with observation platform); southwest of Bad Essen
Linner Berg	181	Bad Essen	Dinosaur tracks; south-southwest of Bad Essen Linne
Kleiner Kellenberg	161.4	Bad Essen	Dinosaur tracks of Barkhausen; south-southeast of Bad Essen-Barkhausen
Großer Kellenberg	211	Melle	Lake of Grüner See nearby; northeast of Buer
Steinbrink	135.6	Bad Essen	South of Bad Essen Lintorf
Schwarzer Brink	211	Bad Essen	South of Bad Essen Dahlinghausen
Egge	198	Preußisch Oldendorf	Wiehen Tower; southwest of the old town of Preußisch Oldendorf
Offelter Berg	178	Preußisch Oldendorf	South of Preußisch Oldendorf-Offelten
Limberg	190	Preußisch Oldendorf	Restored castle of Limberg; northeast Preußisch Oldendorf-Börninghausen
Nonnenstein, (formerly Rödinghauser Berg)	274	Rödinghausen/Preußisch Oldendorf	Observation tower; northwest of Rödinghausen
Maschberg	190	Rödinghausen/Preußisch Oldendorf	North of Schwenningdorf
Donoer Berg	243	Rödinghausen	North of Bieren-Dono
Glösinghauser Berg	289	Preußisch Oldendorf	East of Preußisch Oldendorf-Glösinghausen
Altes Verbrenn	291.1	Preußisch Oldendorf	East of Preußisch Oldendorf-Glösinghausen
Babilonie	255.0	Lübbecke Wallburg cultural monument; south of Lübbecke-Obermehnen	
Blasheimer Berg	287.8	Lübbecke	Schiereck's Temple; south of Lübbecke-Obermehnen
Kahlewart	240	Hüllhorst	North of Hüllhorst-Oberbauerschaft; with Freilichtbühne Kahle Wart
Breitenbrink	287	Hüllhorst	North of Hüllhorst-Oberbauerschaft
Wurzelbrink	318	Lübbecke	Wartturm observation tower; south of Lübbecke
Kniebrink	315	Lübbecke	South of Lübbecke
Meesenkopf	225.8	Lübbecke	South of Lübbecke
Reineberg	276	Lübbecke	Ruins of Reineburg; south of the local hill of Lübbecke
Heidkopf	272.6	Lübbecke	North of Hüllhorst/Ahlsen-Reineberg
**Heidbrink**	**319.6**	Hüllhorst	North of Hüllhorst-Ahlsen-Reineberg
Straußberg	275.5	Lübbecke	South of Lübbecke
Gehlenbecker Berg	275	Lübbecke	Impressive stand of oak near the summit; south of Lübbecke-Gehlenbeck
Eilhauser Berg		Lübbecke	Southeast of Lübbecke-Eilhausen
Nettelstedter Berg	288	Lübbecke	Southwest of Lübbecke-Nettelstedt
Schnathorster Berg also Eickhorster Berg	246.6	Hüllhorst	North of Schnathorst
Bröderhauser Berg also Lübber Berg	251.2	Hille	Near Hille-Oberlübbe; in the vicinity of Oberlübber Bergsee
Elfter Kopf	233	Bad Oeynhausen	West of Wallücke
Bergkirchener Kopf	255.4	Bad Oeynhausen	East of Wallücke, northwest of Bergkirchen with subpeak of Buchenkopf to the north
Haddenhauser Berg	261.3	Bad Oeynhausen	North of Volmerdingsen
Lutternsche Egge	256	Minden	South of Luttern
Eidinghauser Berg	247	Bad Oeynhausen	North of Bad Oeynhausen-Eidinghausen
Häverstädter Berg	269.6	Minden	South of Häverstädt
Wittekindsberg	294,2	Porta Westfalica	Emperor William Monument, Moltke Tower and Wittekindsburg; west of the Porta Westfalica

=== Northernmost German uplands ===
According to folklore, regionally conscious residents around the hills usually admit grudgingly that the Wiehen Hills are not particularly high. In the same breath, they may assert, often with a raised index finger and an odd emphasis on the word gebirge ("hill/mountain range"), that they are the northernmost hill range in Germany and the one closest to the sea. Whether this assertion is true is in fact a matter of definition. It clearly ignores the morainic ridges further north and closer to the sea, as well as other true uplands such as the Stemweder Berg or the Rehburg Hills. Of course, these hills are much lower and do not reach the 200-metre contour line. Of the higher, say up to 300-metre-high (980 ft) uplands, the northern foothills of Deister and Bückeberge extend farther north than the eastern Wiehen range. However, it is also true that the highest part of the Wiehen Hills at Lübbecke has the most northerly hill over 300 metres in Germany. The Heidbrink, at almost 320 metres high, is also the northernmost "three-hundred" on the European continent between the central Ural Mountains and the Atlantic, i.e. excluding the British Isles and Fennoscandinavia.
