= Grüner See (Lower Saxony) =

Lake in Germany

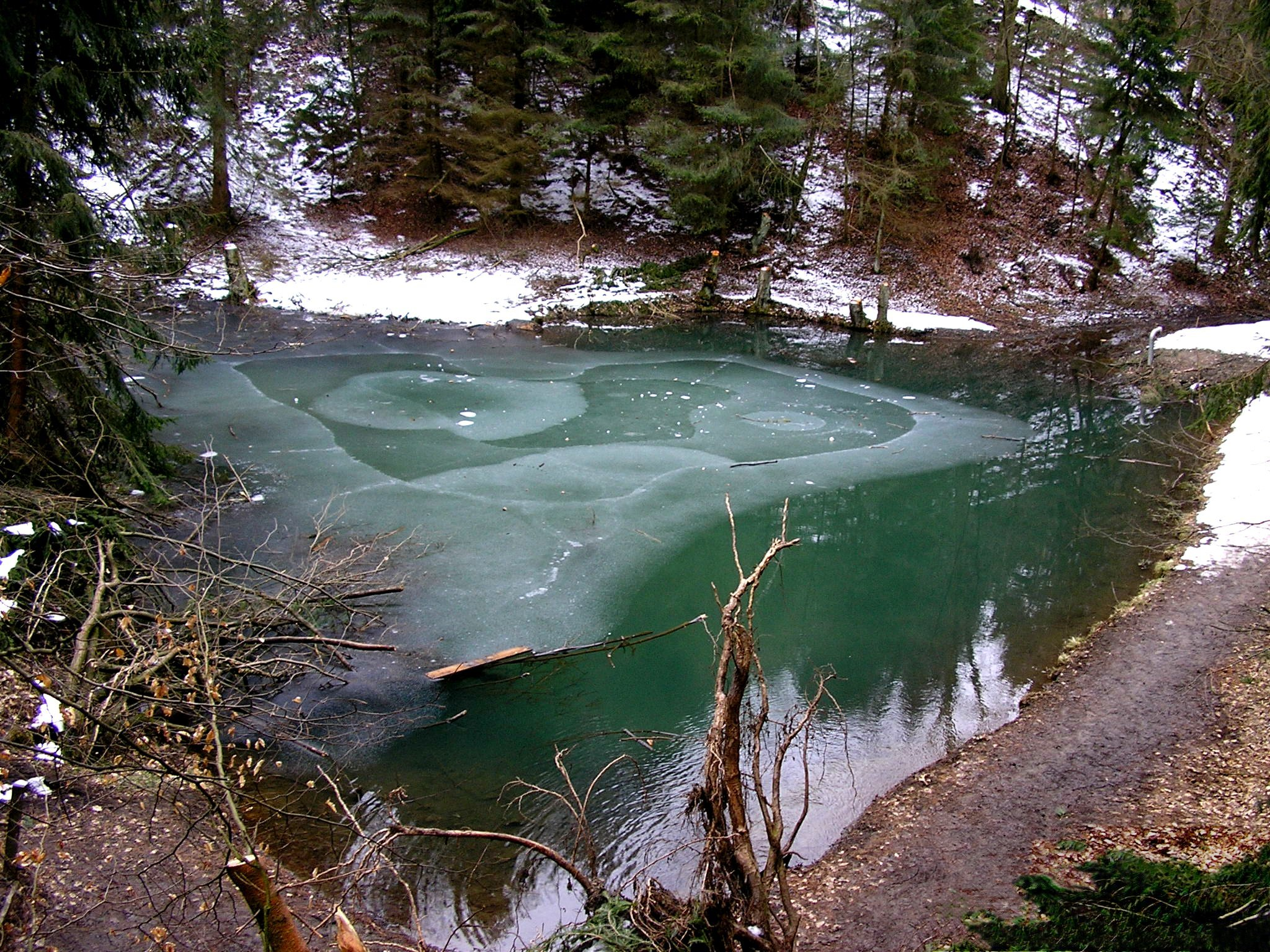

- Location within Lower Saxony
- Location: Wiehengebirge, Landkreis Osnabrück, Lower Saxony
- Coordinates: 52°15′48″N 8°27′16″E
- Primary outflows: Hunte
- Basin countries: Germany
- Surface area: ca. 0.1 ha (0.25 acres)
- Average depth: ca. 1 m (3 ft 3 in)
- Max. depth: ca. 2 m (6 ft 7 in)
- Water volume: 1,000 m^{3} (35,000 cu ft)
- Shore length^{1}: 110 m (360 ft)
- Surface elevation: ca. 145 m (476 ft)
- ^{1} Shore length is not a well-defined measure.

Grüner See is a lake in the Wiehen Hills of the Osnabrück Landkreis in Lower Saxony, Germany. At an elevation of ca 145 metres (476 ft), its surface area is ca. 0.1 hectares (0.25 acres). It is around 25km north of Bielefeld.
