= Heidkopf (Wiehen Hills) =

- Location within North Rhine-Westphalia

Highest point
- Elevation: 273 m above sea level (896 ft)
- Coordinates: 52°17′51″N 8°38′05″E

Geography
- Location: south of Lübbecke, North Rhine-Westphalia
- Parent range: Wiehen Hills

Climbing
- Normal route: Fußweg

The Heidkopf is a 272.6 m high hill in the Wiehen in Minden-Lübbecke district within the borough of Lübbecke. It lies one kilometre north of the Heidbrink and 500 metres northeast of the Reineberg.

The Heidkopf is not very spectacular and is not well known even amongst the townsfolk of Lübbecke. Its summit is partly covered by old beech trees. A footpath runs from the northeast up to the summit. A metalled forest track runs around the hill. Between the Reineberg and the Heidkopf is a ravine that is still very much in a natural state, in which a stream rises, taking its source water from the Wittekind Spring.

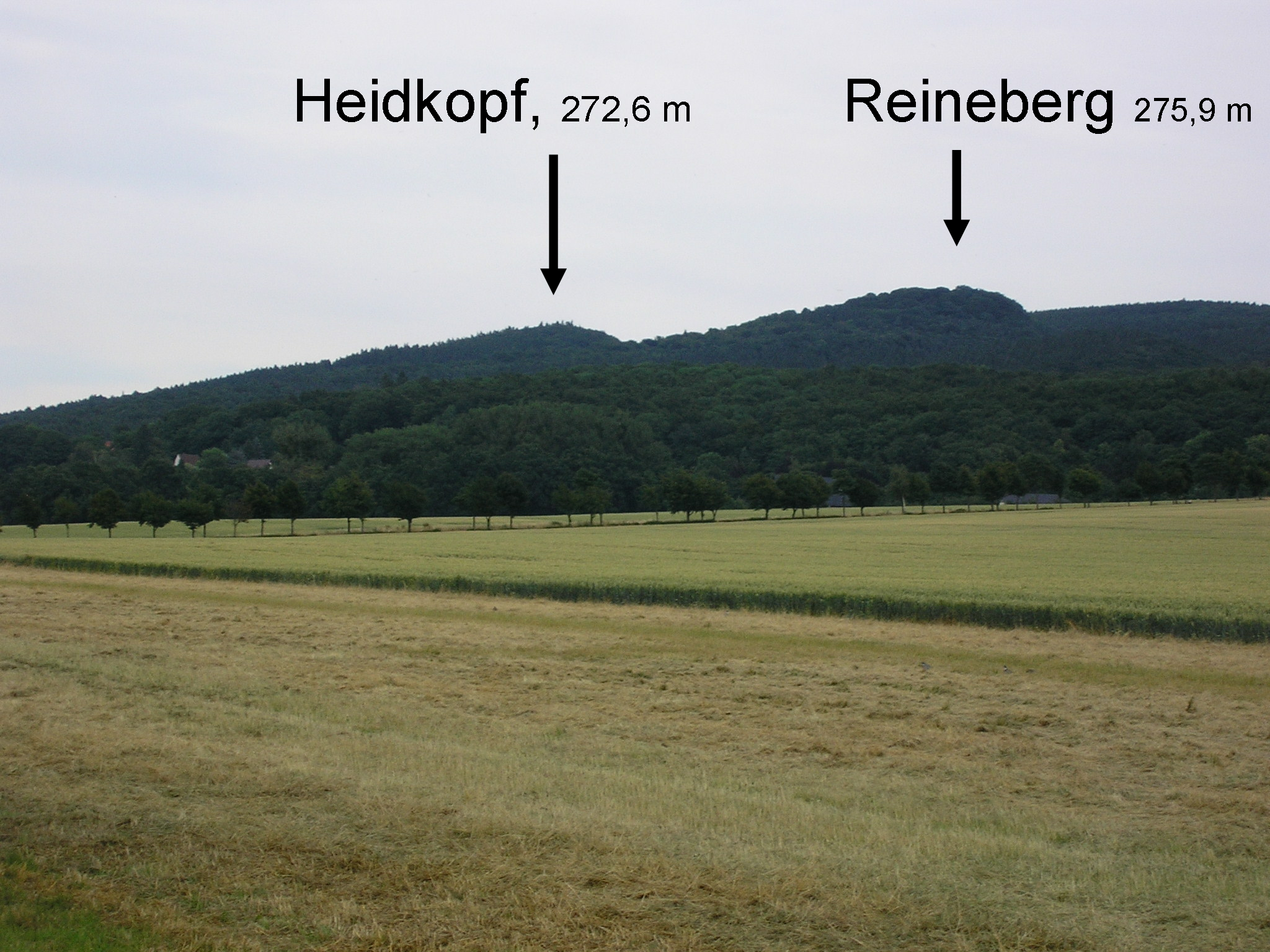

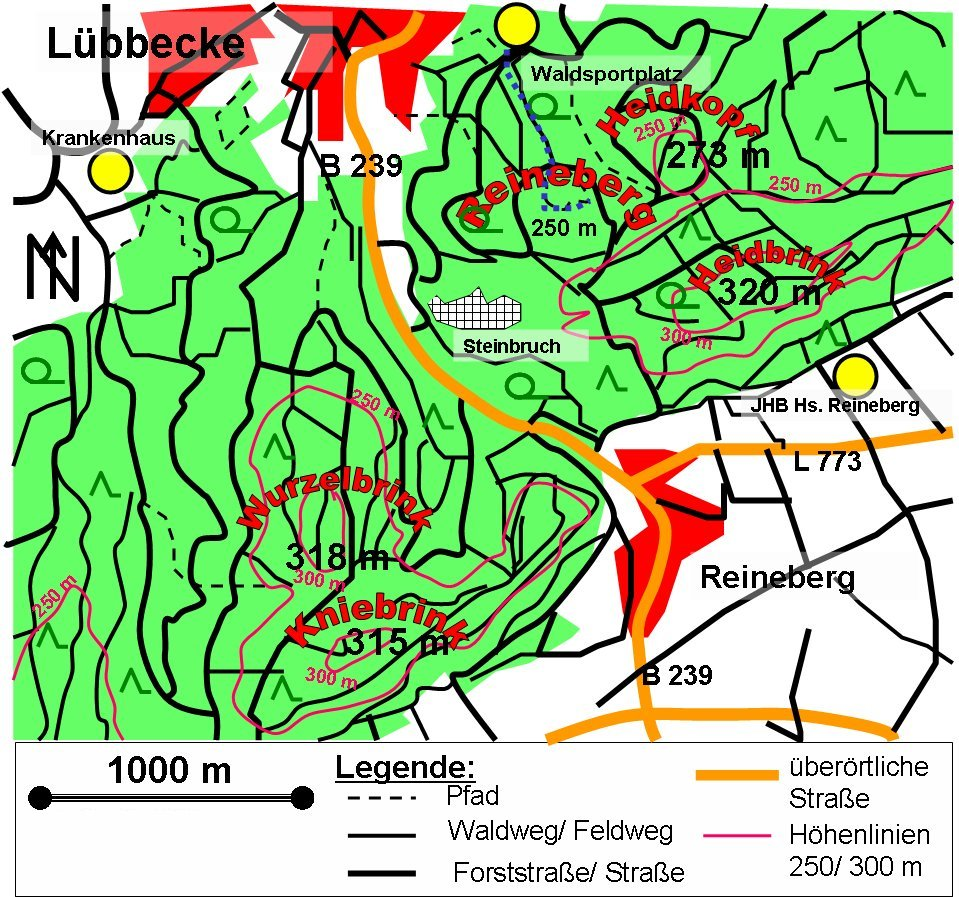

== Gallery ==
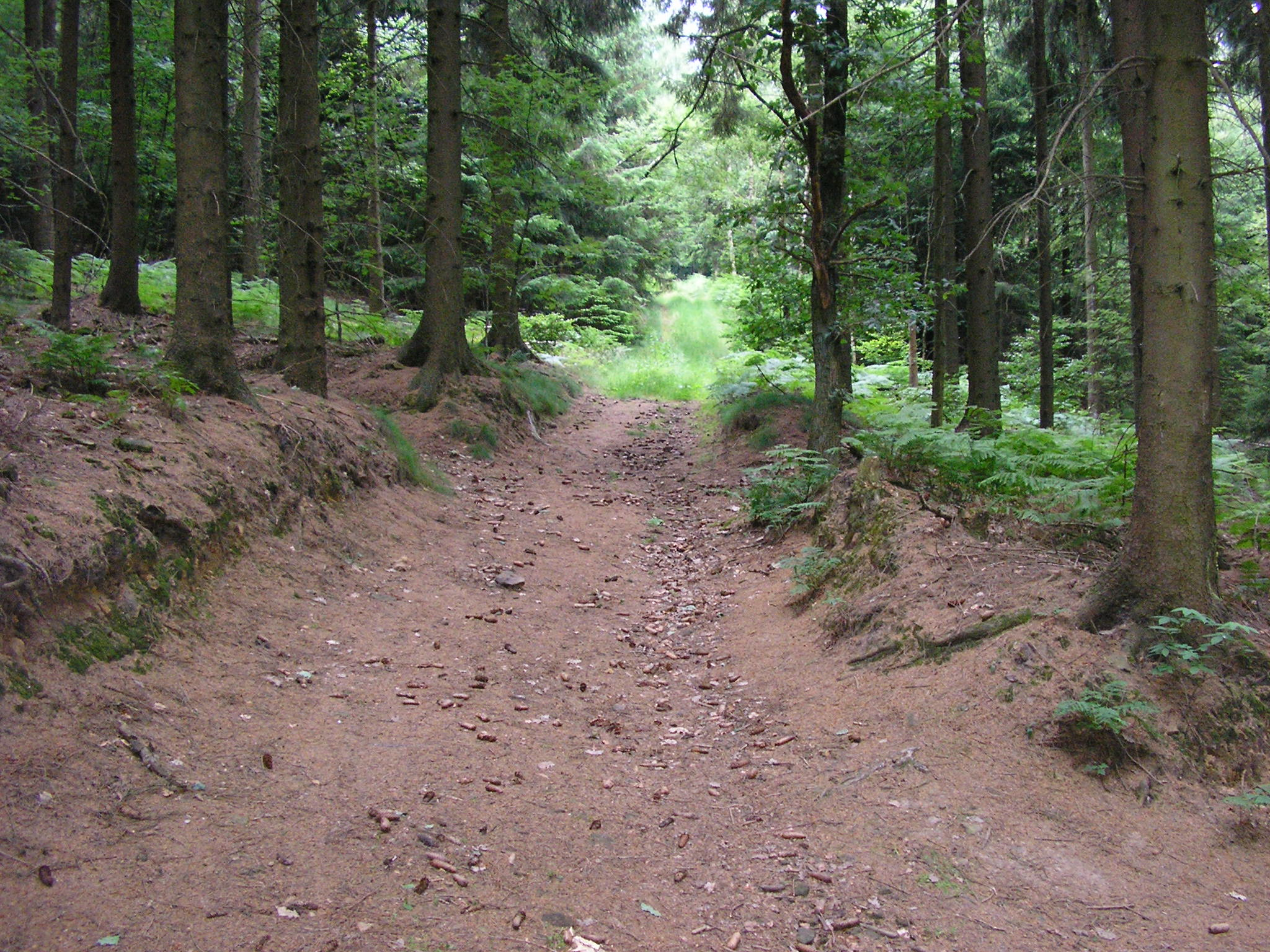
Only this overgrown path runs from the north to the summit

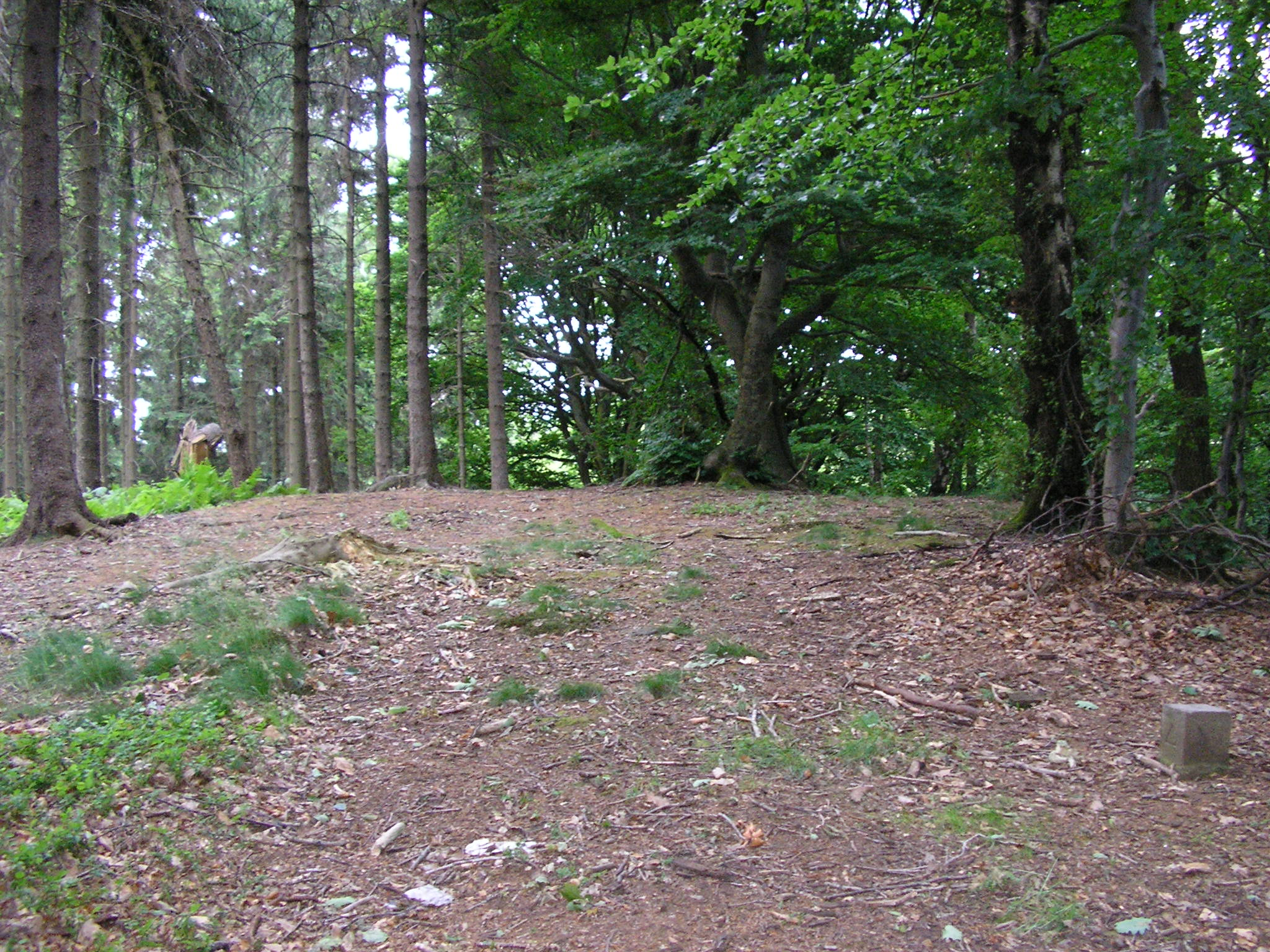
View of the summit. The trig point below right is about 10 metres from the top

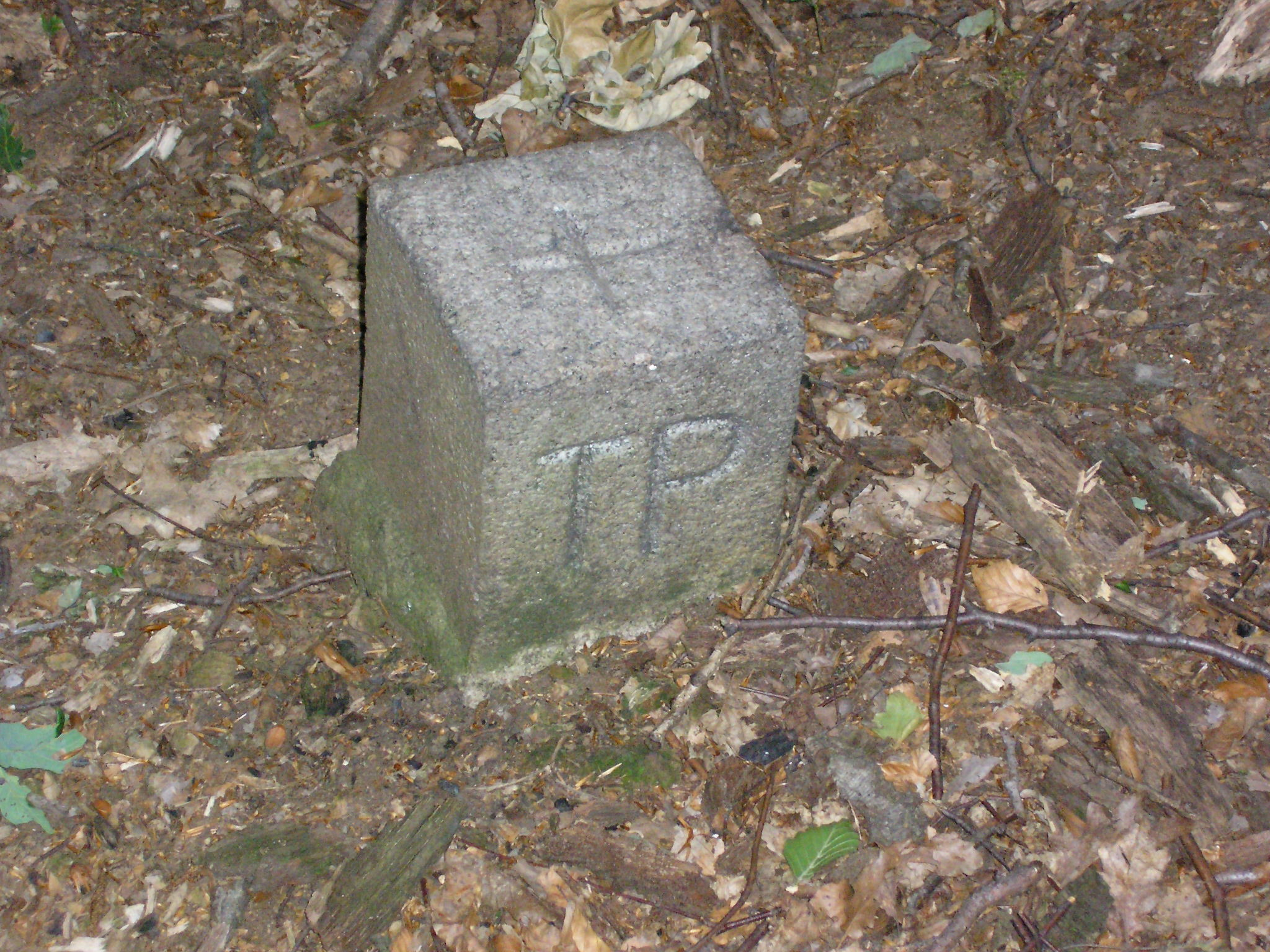
The trig point on the Heidkopf
