= Bad Essen =

- Municipality
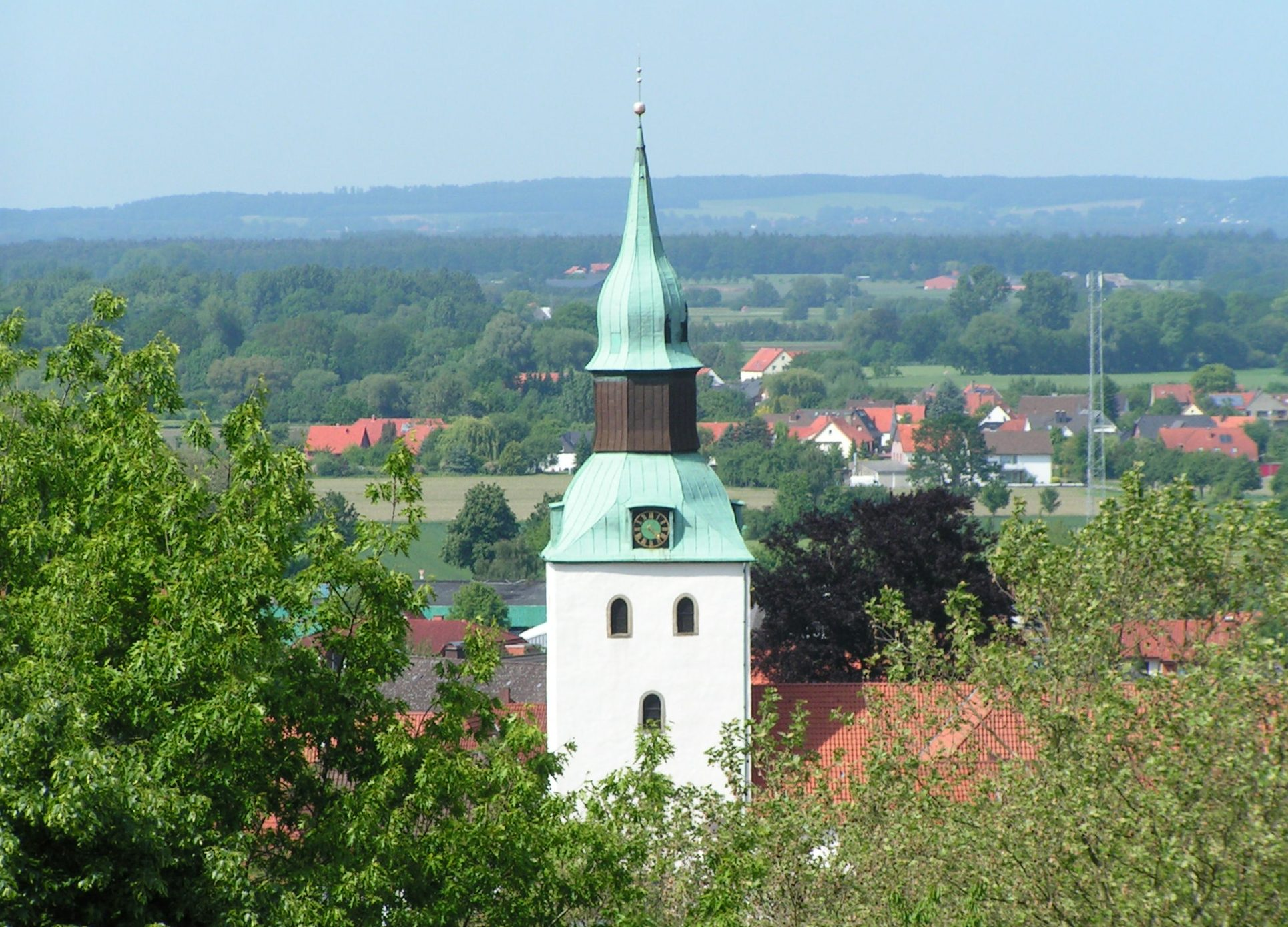
- Bad Essen

- Coat of arms

- Location of Bad Essen within Osnabrück district
- Interactive map of Bad Essen
- Location within Germany Location within Lower Saxony
- Coordinates: 52°19′17″N 8°20′24″E
- Country: Germany
- State: Lower Saxony
- District: Osnabrück

Government
  - Mayor (2021–26): Timo Natemeyer (SPD)

Area
  - Total: 103.33 km^{2} (39.90 sq mi)
- Elevation: 113 m (371 ft)

Population (2025-12-31)
  - Total: 16,265
  - Density: 157.41/km^{2} (407.69/sq mi)
- Time zone: UTC+01:00 (CET)
  - Summer (DST): UTC+02:00 (CEST)
- Postal codes: 49152
- Dialling codes: 05472
- Vehicle registration: OS, BSB, MEL, WTL
- Website: www.badessen.de

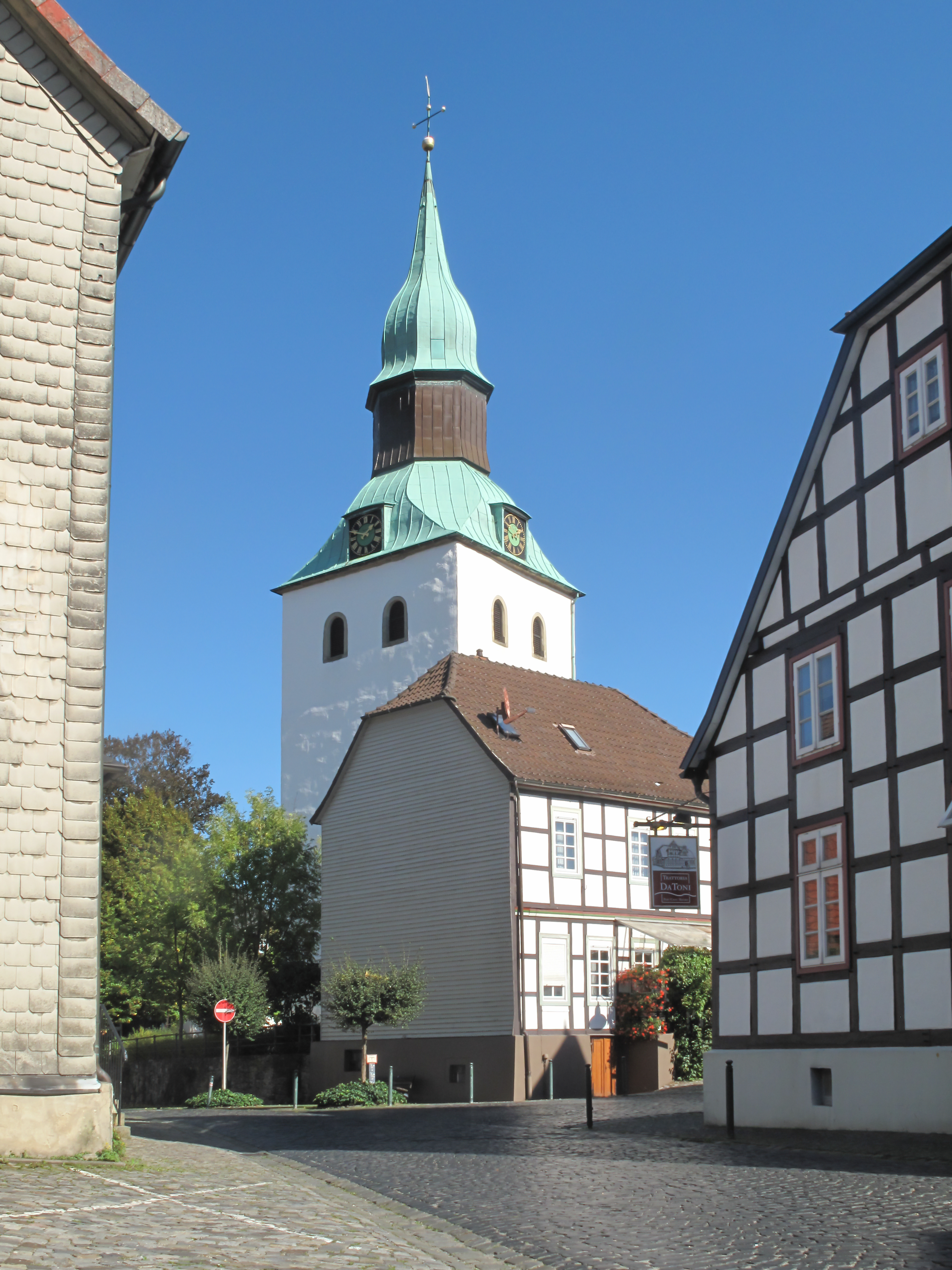
Bad Essen, church: die Sankt Nikolauskirche

Bad Essen (German pronunciation: [baːt ˈʔɛsn̩]) is a small municipality and health resort in the district of Osnabrück, in Lower Saxony. Bad Essen with its historical centre is located on the German Timber-Frame Road.

== Geography ==
The town of Bad Essen is on the North German Plains, because of the transition of the low mountain range to the plains. The Wiehengebirge Range covers approximately the southern third of the town and reaches an elevation of 211m above sea level. The highest point of the Wiehengebirge Range is on the black Brink in Lintorf. The northern part of the town is flat, with an average elevation of 50m above sea level. The Hunte flows through the eastern part of Bad Essen northwards and crosses the Midland Canal in Wittlage.
