= Wartturm (Lübbecke) =

Coordinates: 52°16′58″N 8°36′54″E

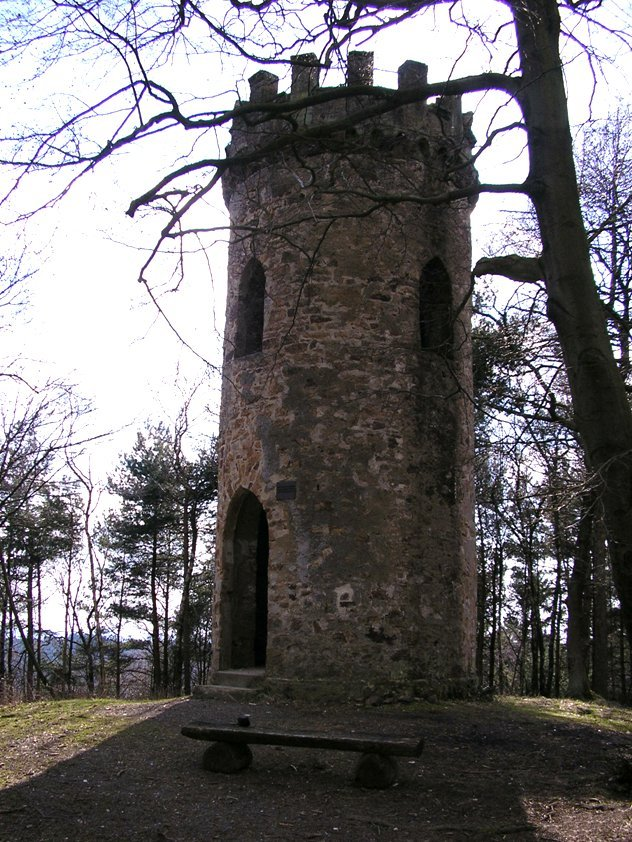
The Wartturm today

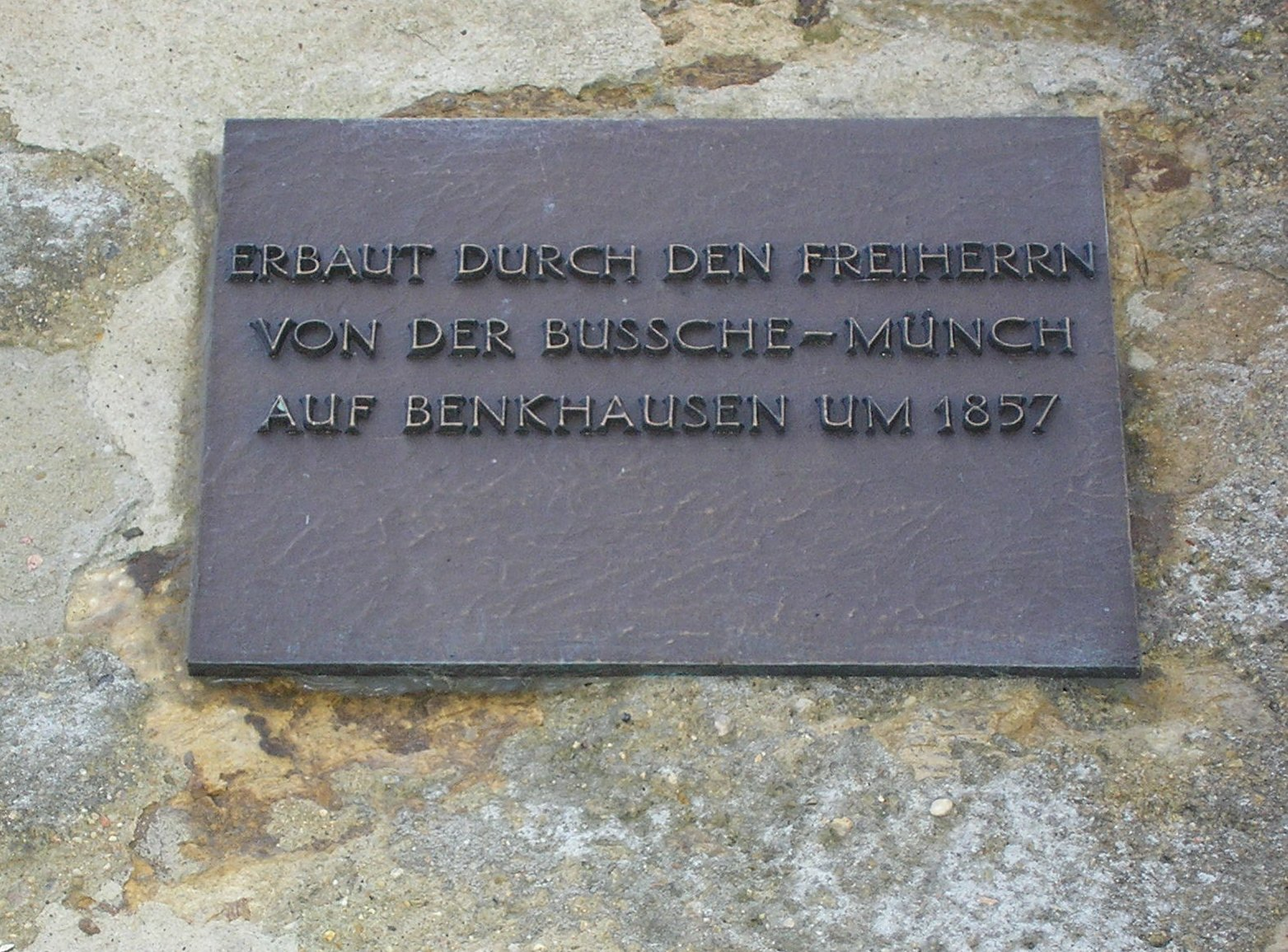
Commemorative tablet on the Wartturm

The Wartturm ("watchtower") is an observation tower in the Wiehen Hills on the Wurzelbrink, a wooded hill that, at 319 metres, is the second highest in this hill range. The tower stands on the territory of the town of Lübbecke. The stone tower was built in 1857 by the barons (Freiherrn) of Bussche-Münch from Benkhausen and was completely renovated in 1996. The tower was erected in response to the increasing gymnastics and hiking movement in Germany at that time. During the Nazi era and the Second World War the tower acted for a time as a training area for the Hitler Youth as well as an observation point, for which purpose it had been increased in height by the addition of a wooden superstructure. In 1986 a radio competition took place at the Wartturm. In the early to mid-1980s a very high transmission mast stood next to the tower, that was significantly higher than the tower itself and, unlike the Wartturm, could be clearly seen from Lübbecke. The uninformed often say that the tower is linked to the medieval castle of Reineberg because of its castle-like appearance but are then often surprised to find that it is a product of the Modern Age.

The Wartturm has since become the landmark of the traditional Wartturm Run (Wartturmlauf). This fun run takes place annually in June, beginning in the centre Lübbecke, is 13.9 kilometres long and climbs a total height of 346 metres.
