= Ronceva =

River in Germany

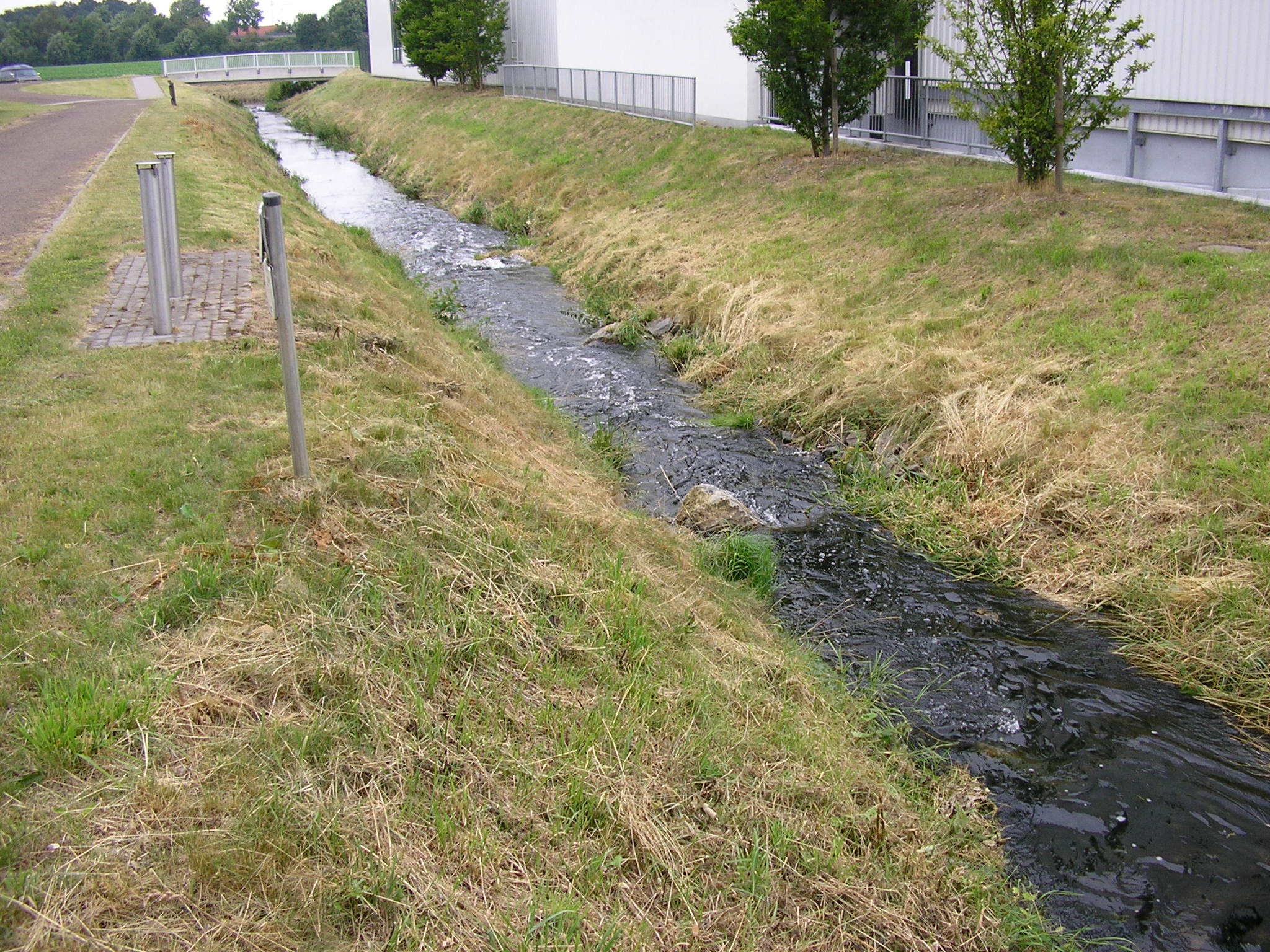
- Lower reaches of the Ronceva

Location
- Country: Germany
- State: North Rhine-Westphalia
- Reference no.: DE: 476142

Physical characteristics
- Source
  - location: Wiehen Hills south of Lübbecke
  - coordinates: 52°17′19″N 8°37′36″E
  - elevation: ca. 175 m above sea level (NN)
- Mouth
  - location: north of Lübbecke into the Flöthe
  - coordinates: 52°19′51″N 8°37′10″E
  - elevation: 51 m above sea level (NN)
- Length: 5.052 km

Basin features
- Progression: Flöthe→ Große Aue→ Weser→ North Sea
- Landmarks: Small towns: Lübbecke
- Population: ca. 16,000

The Ronceva (also Roncevabach) is a stream that flows through the East Westphalian town of Lübbecke.

== Course ==
The source of the Ronceva lies at 230 m above NN in the Wiehen between the hills of Heidbrink and Horsts Höhe at the lower end of the Mensinger Ravine. It flows initially to the east of the B 239 federal road on its way to the town of Lübbecke. The stream flows underground in the area of the town itself. North of the town the Ronceva resurfaces before emptying into the Flöthe flows within Lübbecke's industrial estate, immediately next to the factory buildings of Gauselmann (at 49 m above NN). The Ronceva has a length of around 5 km, of which about 1.5 km is piped underground. The catchment area of the Ronceva covers around 4 km^{2}, i.e. just 7% of the total area of the borough of Lübbecke. In spite of its relatively short length the Ronceva flows through three markedly different landscapes: the Wiehen Hills, the Lübbecke Loessland and finally the Rahden-Diepenau Geest.

== Historical importance ==
The old Saxon name for Lübbecke, Hlidbeki, which means kleiner Bach (English: "little beck", Low German: lüt Beek or lüttke Beke ) refers to the Ronceva. It was the stream that provided the incentive to found a settlement here; the steep downhill course of the brook supplying power to water mills in the area of the present day town. As a result, the Ronceva was led along the eastern ditch of the town and, in about 1750, powered five mills in the town centre. Outside the town, in front of the Bergertor gate (south of the town wall) and the Niedertor gate (in the north of the town) two more mills were driven by the Ronceva. The best-known mill was the Reineberger Amtsmühle ("Reineberg District Mill"). Its associated timber-framed building by the B239 is known today as the Königsmühle ("King's Mill"). The Ronceva was also depicted indirectly on the old coat of arms of the former district of Lübbecke. The wavy bar represents the etymological origin of Lübbecke, which is derived from Hlid beki, i.e. the stream (beki) which is called the Ronceva today. The colours of the coat of arms were those of the Prince-Bishopric of Minden as well as the County of Ravensberg. This old coat of arms was authorised in 1935 by the Prussian State Ministry but was replaced in 1968 by another coat of arms.

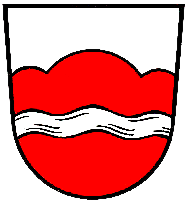
The Ronceva symbolised as a stream in front of the Dreiberg (Wiehen Hills) in the old Lübbecke coat of arms

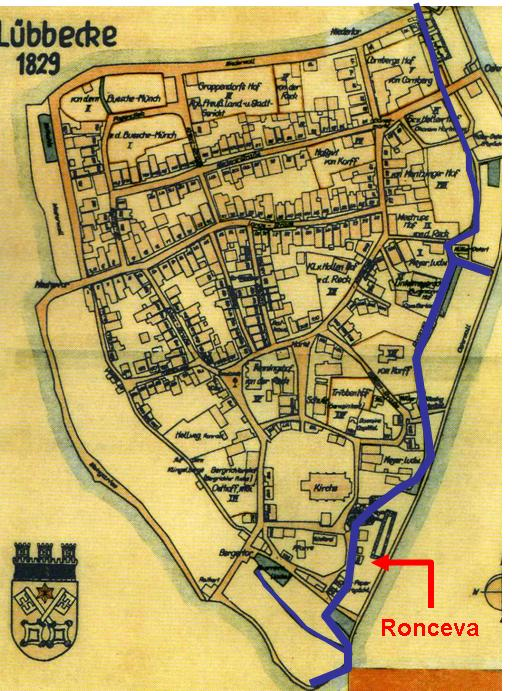
This historic map shows that the Ronceva once ran along the eastern ditch of the town. Today the stream in this area has largely been covered over.

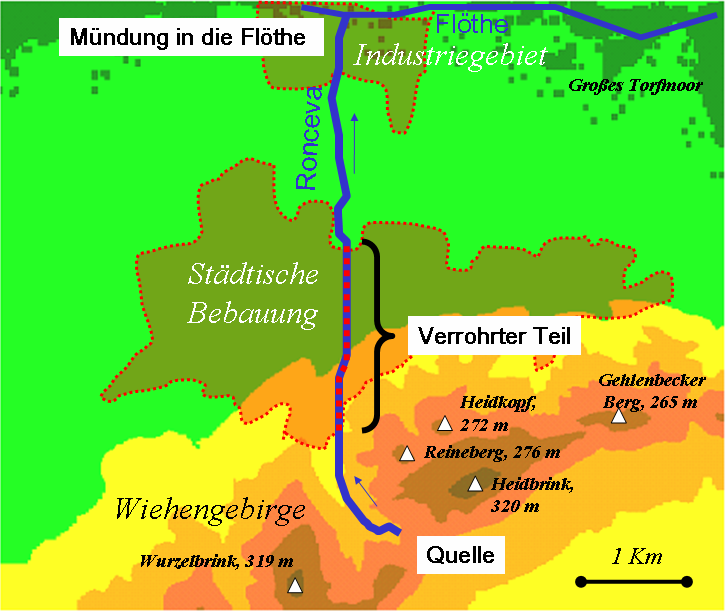
This map shows the course of the Ronceva today

== Appearance ==
Within the town limits, from the Ernst Barre Private Brewery, the Ronceva is largely led through pipes. Only in the vicinity of the market place has it been made visible again (since 1988) and impounded to create a small pond. In addition, there are discussions about opening up the stream in other areas of the town centre. In the Overall Economic Plan for the Town Centre of Lübbecke it says :"(…) where the possibility exists, attempts should be made, in the area of the former course of the Ronceva, to make the stream visible again as a key and historic element (…)".

== Economic and ecological importance ==
It spite of its overall drop in height of 180 metres the water power of the Ronceva no longer plays any role today because of its low annual water yield. On the positive side, it is now important for local sports anglers who are able to catch perch, roach and gudgeon. Fishing is permitted on the Ronceva from the Rote Mühle road to its confluence with the Flöthe. Above Lübbecke the Ronceva has a water quality of class I to II, and this section of the stream can therefore be described as unpolluted or lightly polluted. In the area of Lübbecke's industrial estate the stream picks up the effluent from a sewage plant, in which waste water from a meat-processing plant is treated, so that the water quality of the Ronceva at its confluence with the Flöthe is quite clearly of class III (heavily polluted).

== Gallery ==
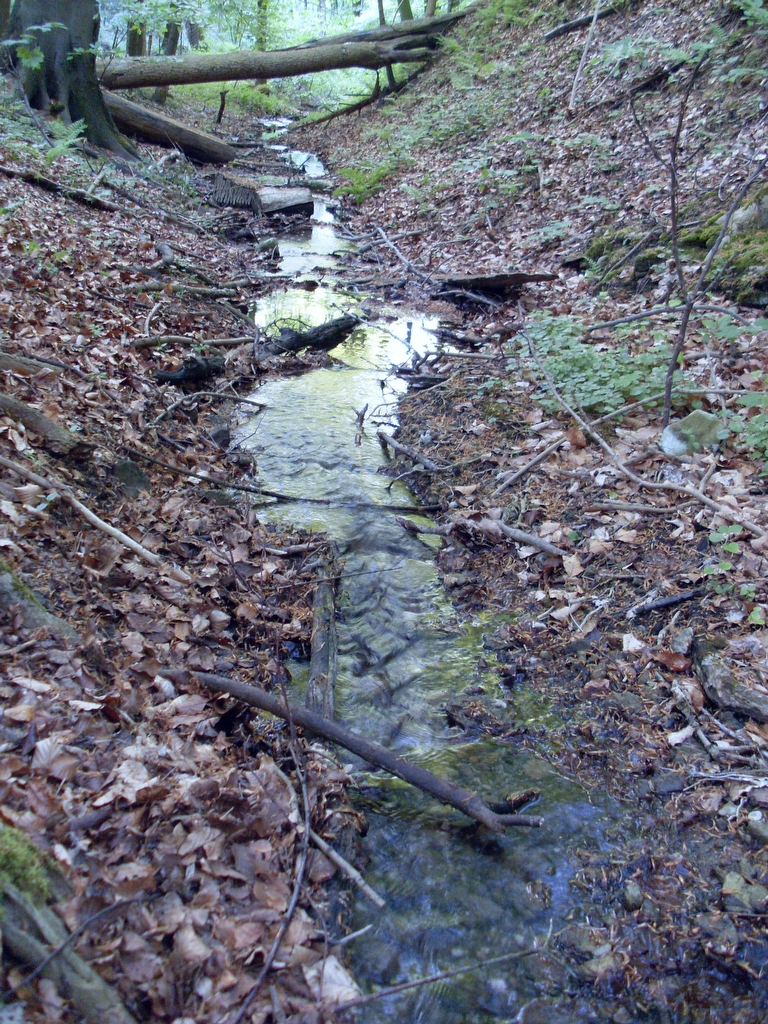
The still youthful Ronceva just before heading between the Barre brewery and Horst Höhe near the Reineberg hill

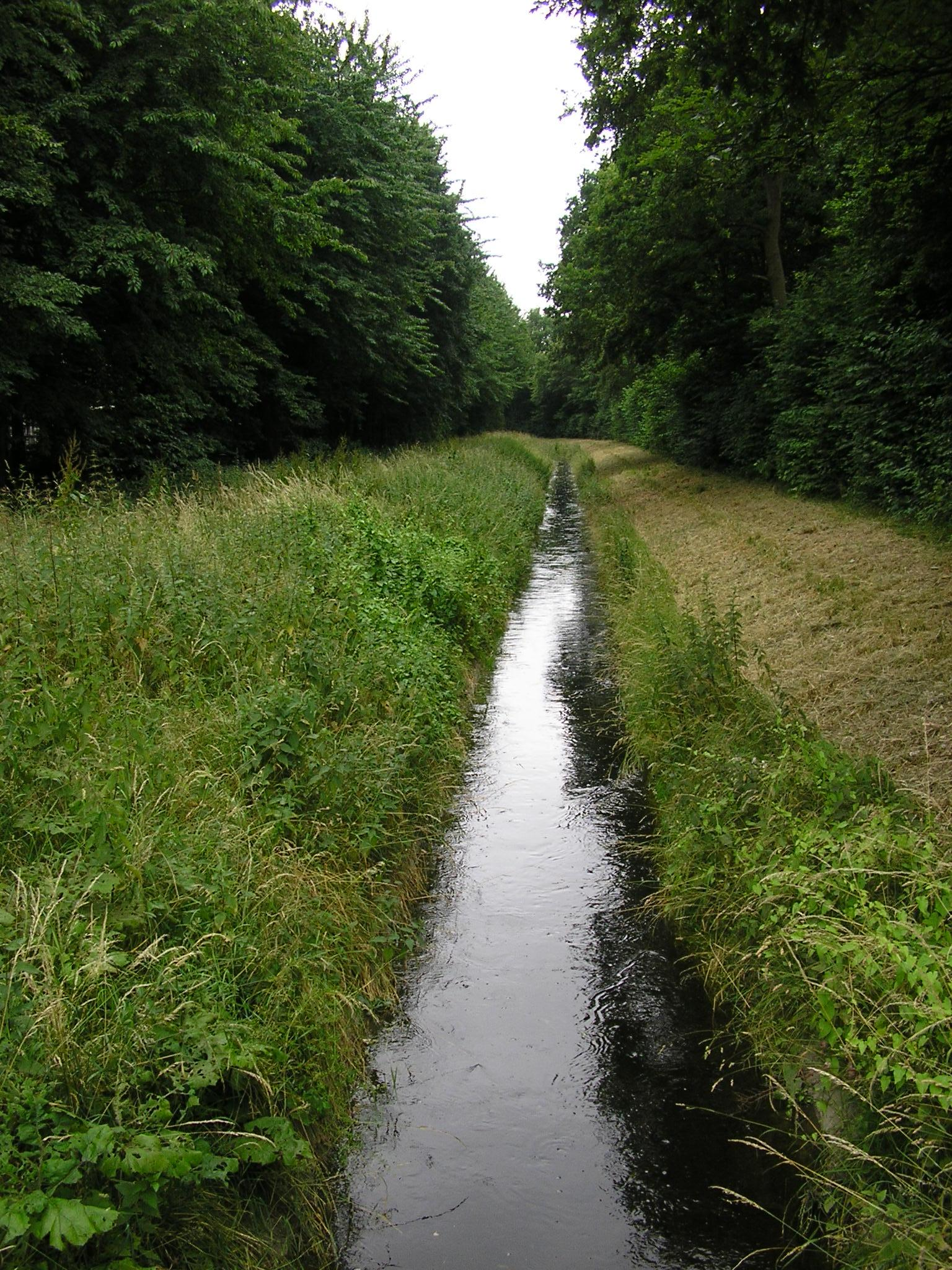
The Ronceva's lower reaches in Lübbecke's industrial estate

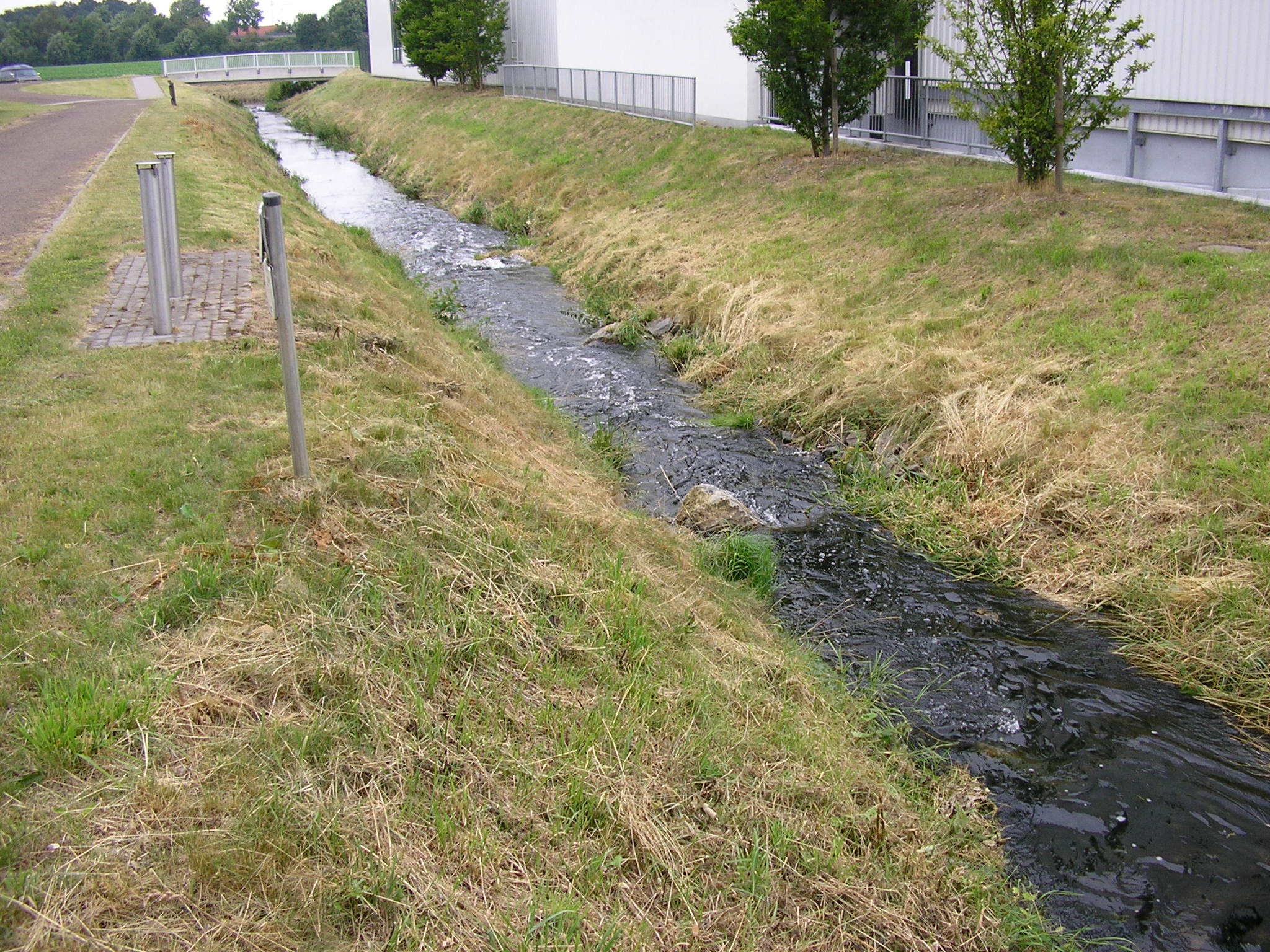
The rushing Ronceva just before its mouth, located behind the bridge in the background. Anglers can be seen on the bridge

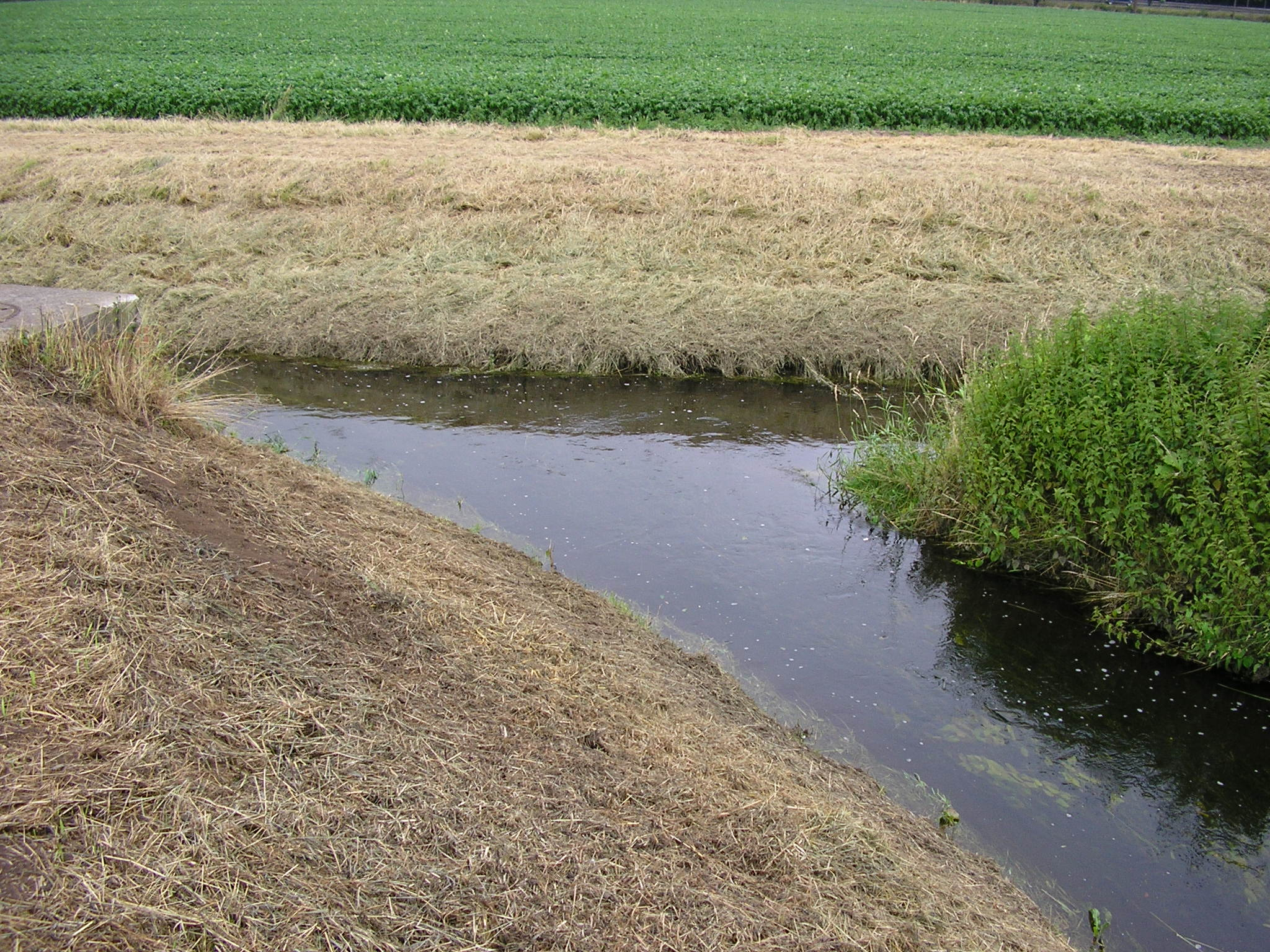
The confluence of the Ronceva with the Flöthe

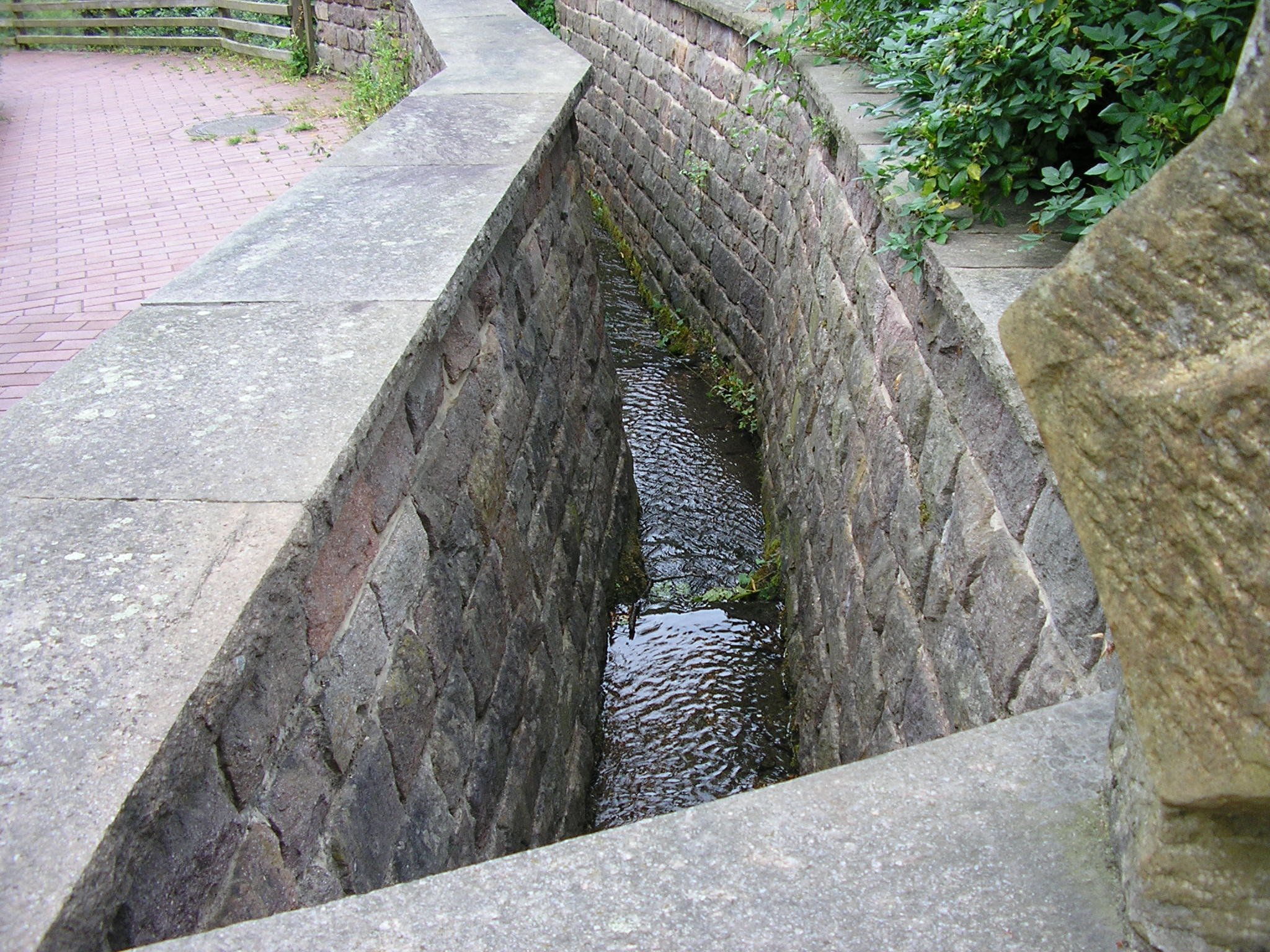
The Ronceva surfaces again near the market place...

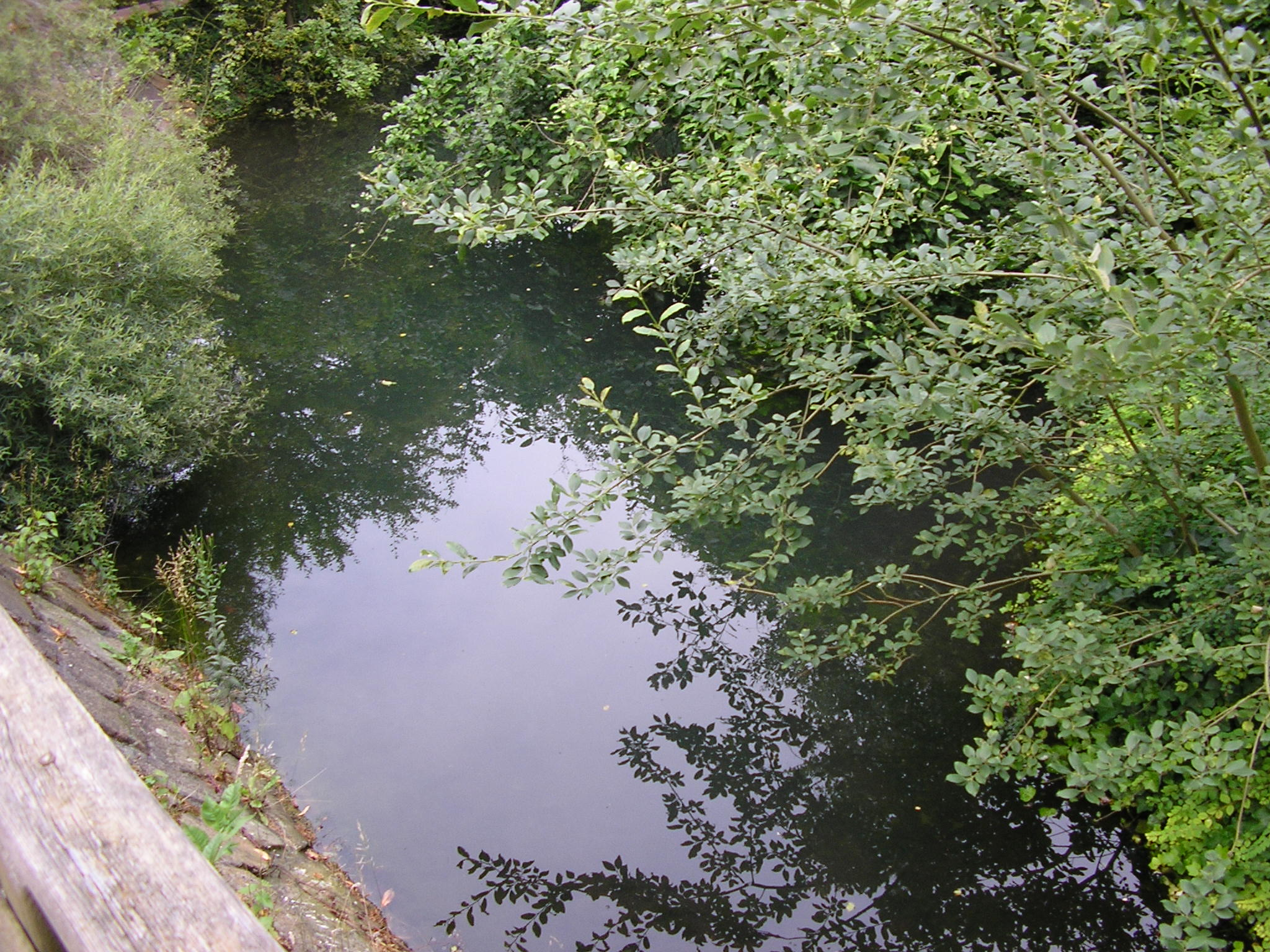
...and is then impounded to form a small pond, before disappearing underground again.

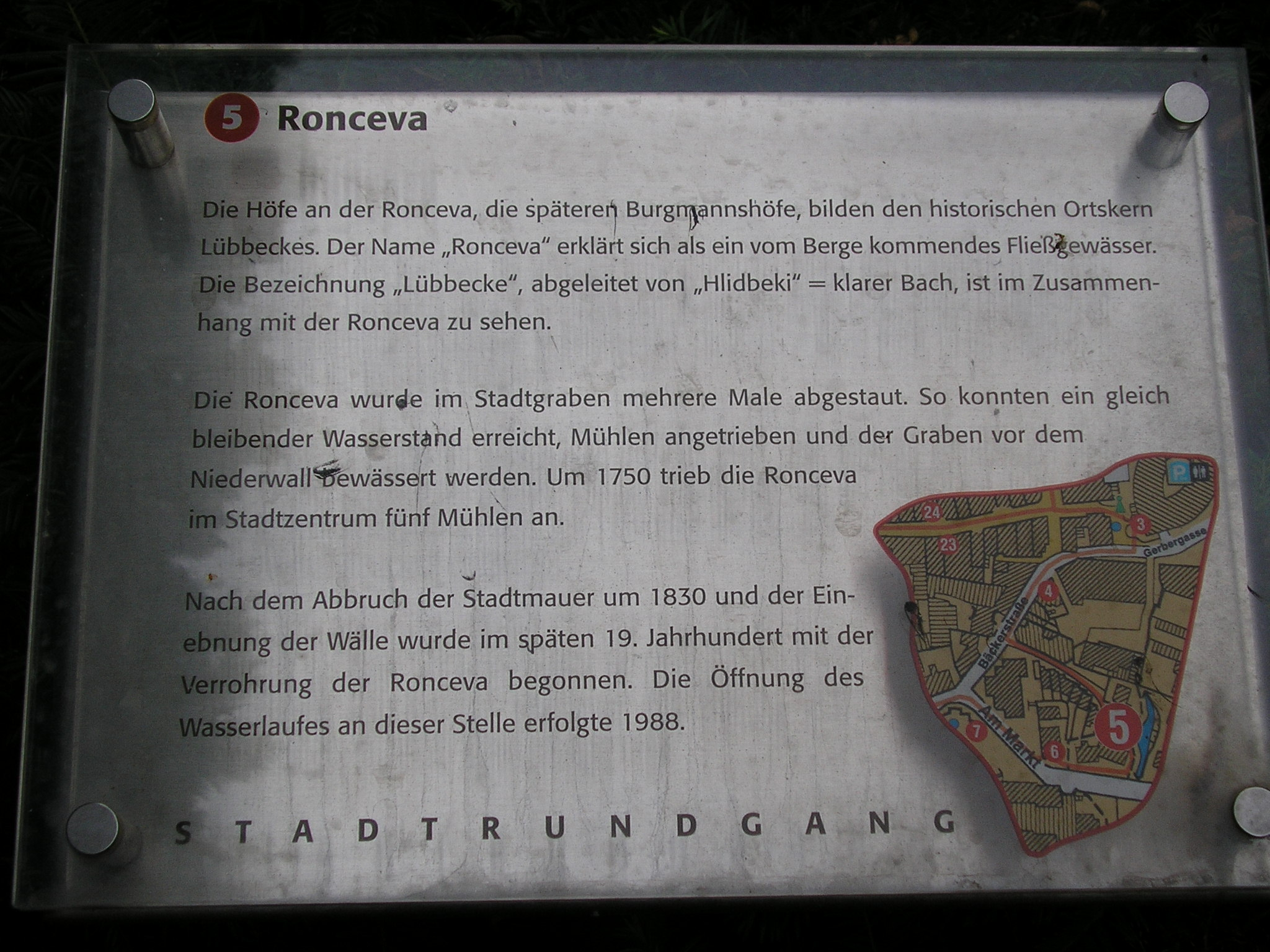
The Ronceva as a way stop on the town walk.
