= Wurzelbrink =

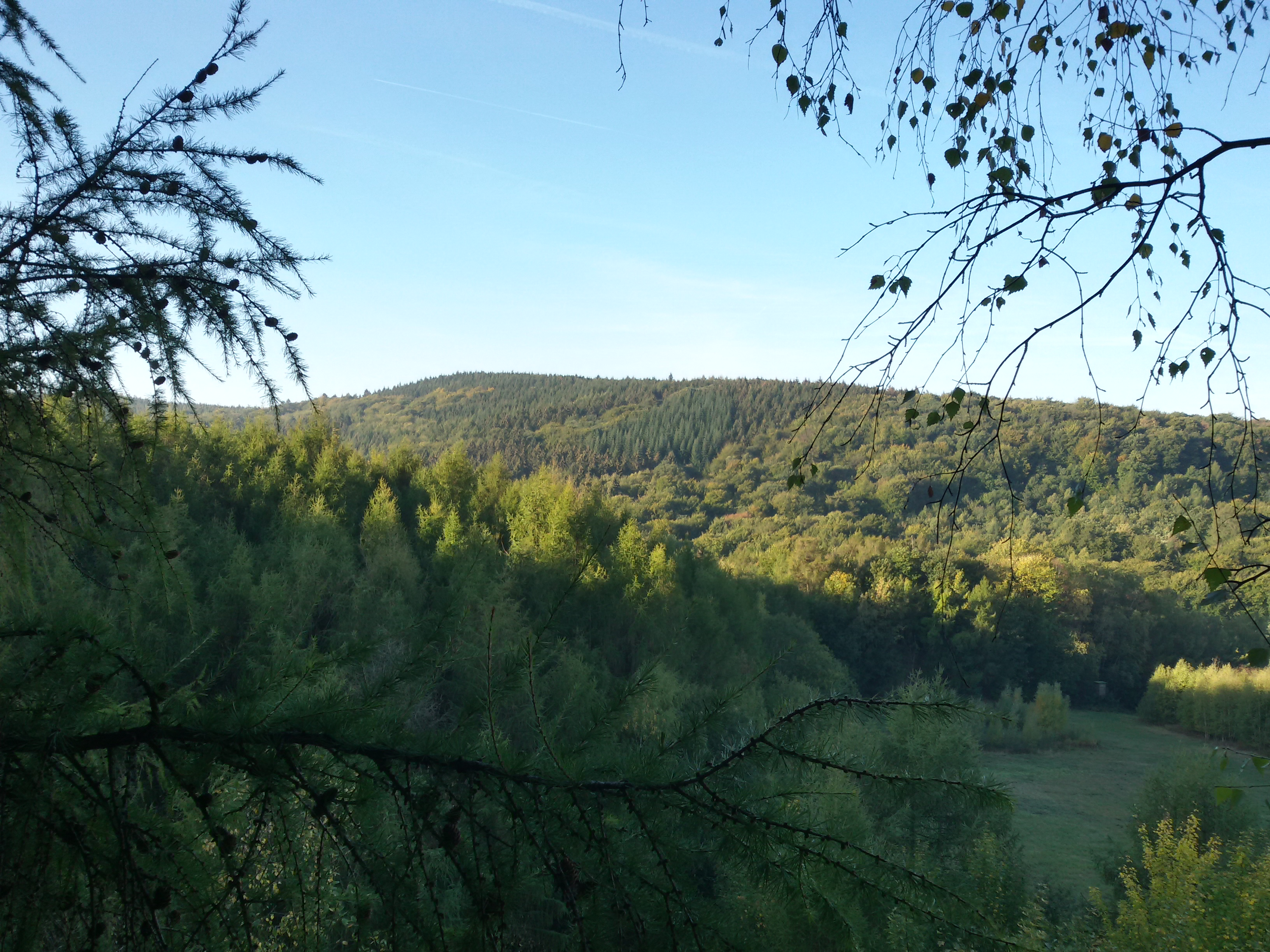
- View of the Wurzelbrink from Reineberg

Highest point
- Elevation: 318 m above sea level (NN) (1,043 ft)
- Coordinates: 52°16′58″N 8°36′54″E

Geography
- Location within North Rhine-Westphalia
- Location: North Rhine-Westphalia, Germany
- Parent range: Wiehen Hills

The Wurzelbrink is a hill south of Lübbecke which, at 318 m above NN, is the second highest peak in the Wiehen Hills in north Germany. Immediately to the south is the no less majestic Kniebrink (315 m). There is an old and rather small watchtower, the Wartturm, on top of the Wurzelbrink, which was built in 1857, whose outstanding views of the local area are partly obscured by the trees that have now grown up around it.

== Views ==
Towards the east the "King of the Wiehen Hills", the Heidbrink (320 m), towers above the surrounding terrain. About 20 years ago, when the trees were much lower, the hills of the Stemweder Berg (also called the Stemme Hills or Stemmer Berge), which are up to 181 m high, could be seen in good weather about 25 km away. Between the Wiehen Hills and the Stemweder Berg lies the broad expanse of the Lübbecke Land, that used to form the independent district of Kreis Lübbecke until the regional reforms of the 1970s. To the northeast, the Großes Torfmoor ("Great Peat Bog") can be made out about 6 km away between the villages of Gehlenbeck/Nettelstedt and the Mittelland Canal. This is the most northerly and largest fen in Westphalia and is a nature reserve. The only wild white storks in Westphalia breed here. To the east the Wiehen Hills run in a curve to the Westphalian Gap a good 25 km away, which is visible in good weather. Unfortunately this view is obstructed today by the tall trees that have grown up; there is only a rather restricted view to the south: in that direction the rolling terrain of the Ravensberg Hollow. On the horizon one can clearly make out the Teutoburg Forest, also called the Osning. Particularly striking is the large TV tower near Bielefeld. In very good conditions, with the aid of binoculars, the sword point of Hermann's Monument (Hermanns-Denkmal) can be seen.

The Mensinger Ravine begins on the eastern side of the hill and runs northwards.

It is worth noting that if the tower were raised by a few metres, as has been done for the neighbouring observation tower on the Nonnenstein, it would afford the hiker clear views again.

== Spring on the Wurzelbrink ==
On the western slope of the hill, a spring rises immediately next to a hiking trail. The spring has been comprehensively walled in. Occasionally you can see the locals fill cans and other containers on carts here, with this apparently very drinkable source of water, for their domestic use. In the springtime the source yields 10 litres of water per minute. In summer, the yield can drop to more or less nothing, however, depending on the weather. So far the source has not been given any legally binding name. However, local residents have for decades called it, jocularly, the Mickey Mouse Spring. According to unofficial chemical analysis the spring water generally has very low levels of pollutants. Only the proportion of copper ions is relatively high for human consumption but this use is still safe.

== Gallery ==
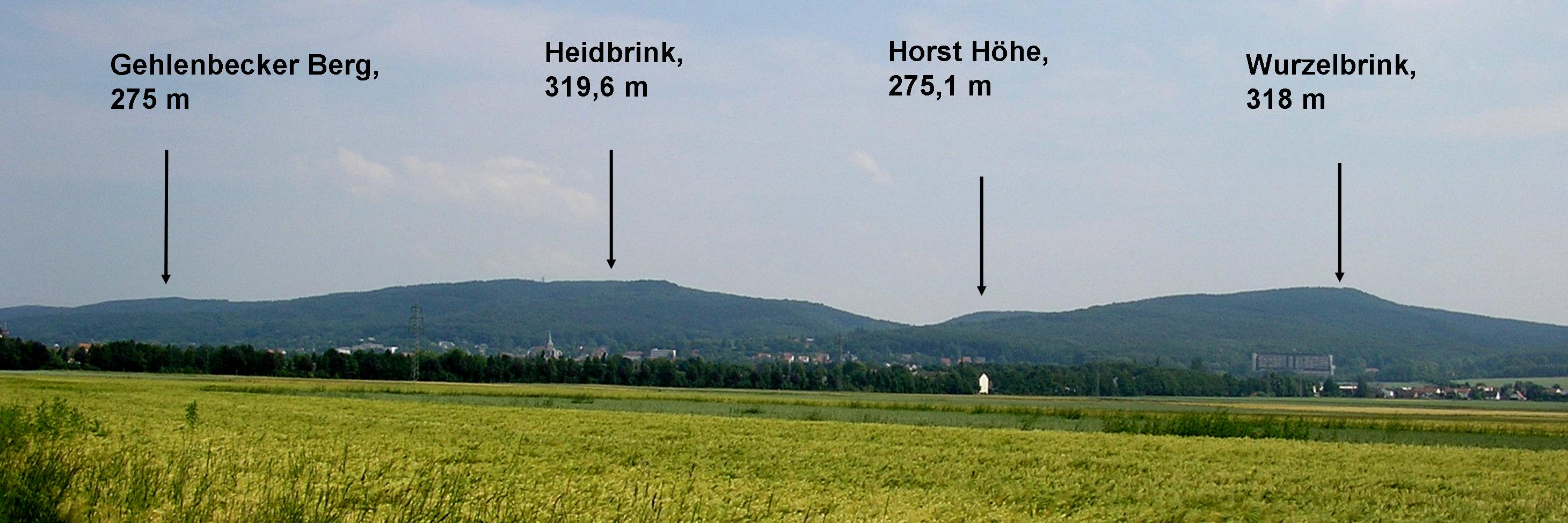
The Wurzelbrink (far right) seen from the north

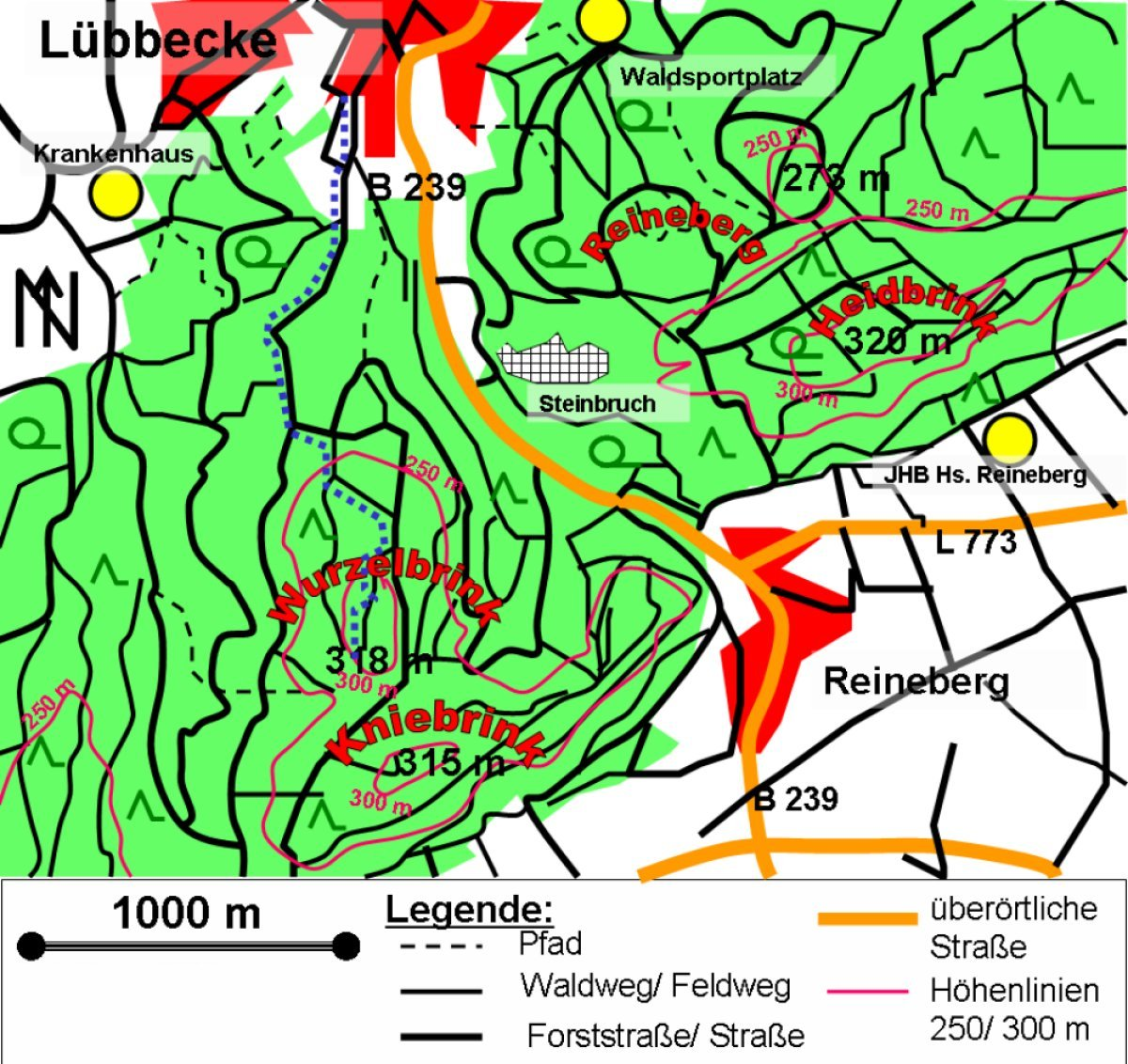
From Lübbecke it takes 45–60 minutes to climb the Wurzelbrink

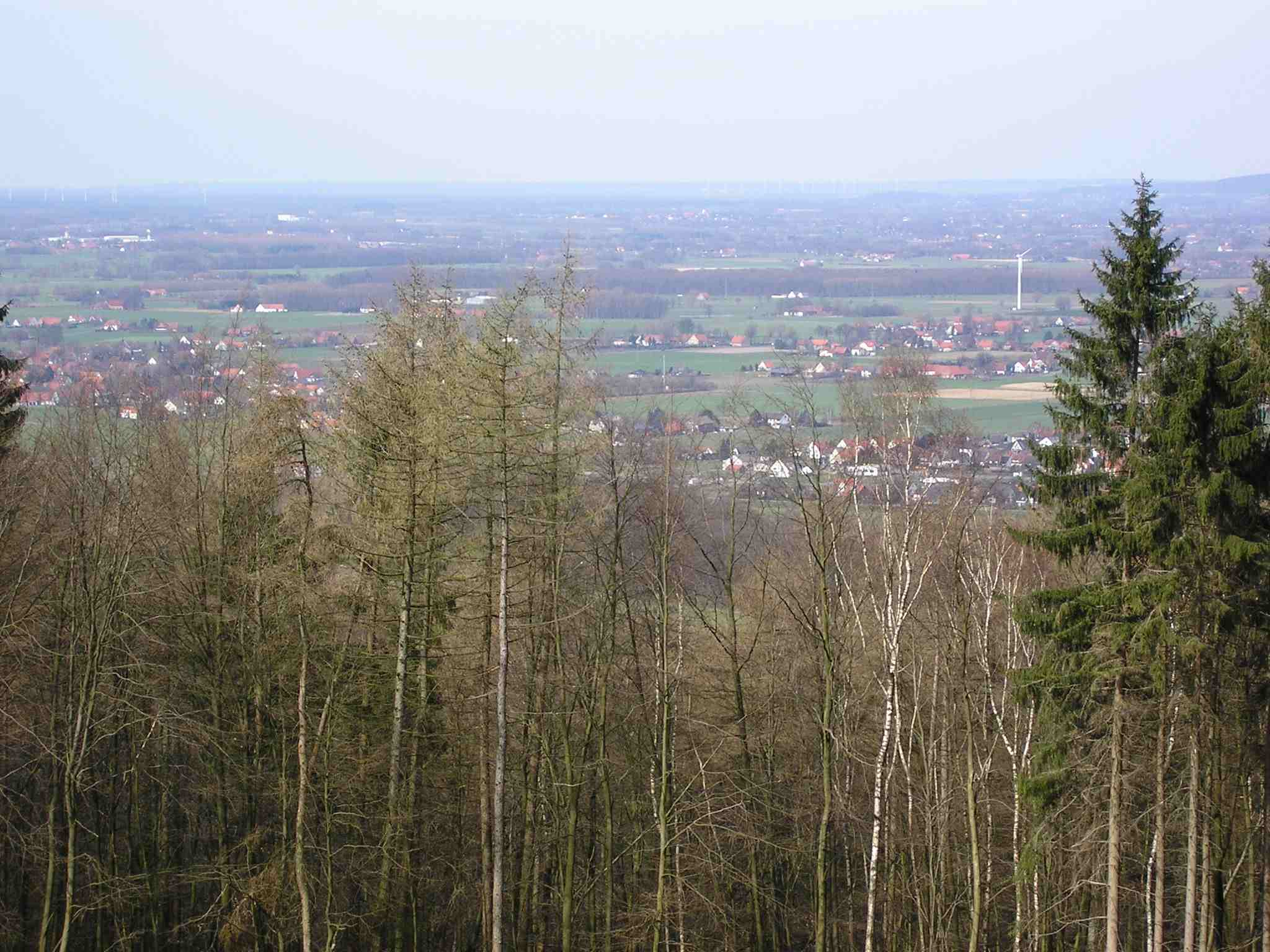
On the northwestern flank of the Wurzelbrink a clearing enables a view of the Lübbecke Land.

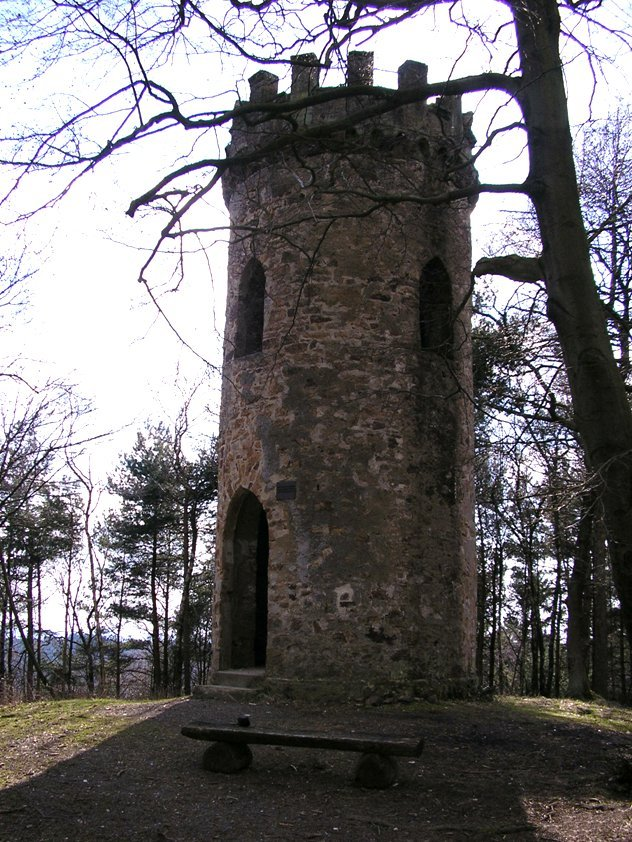
The watchtower (Wartturm) on the summit of the Wurzelbrink

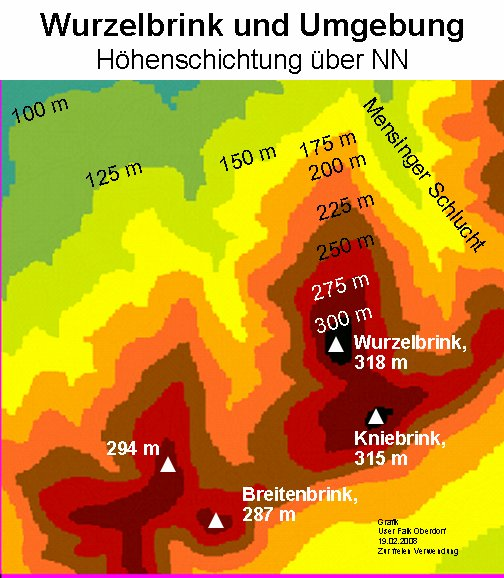
Next to the Wurzelbrink the Kniebrink also rises above the 300 metre mark

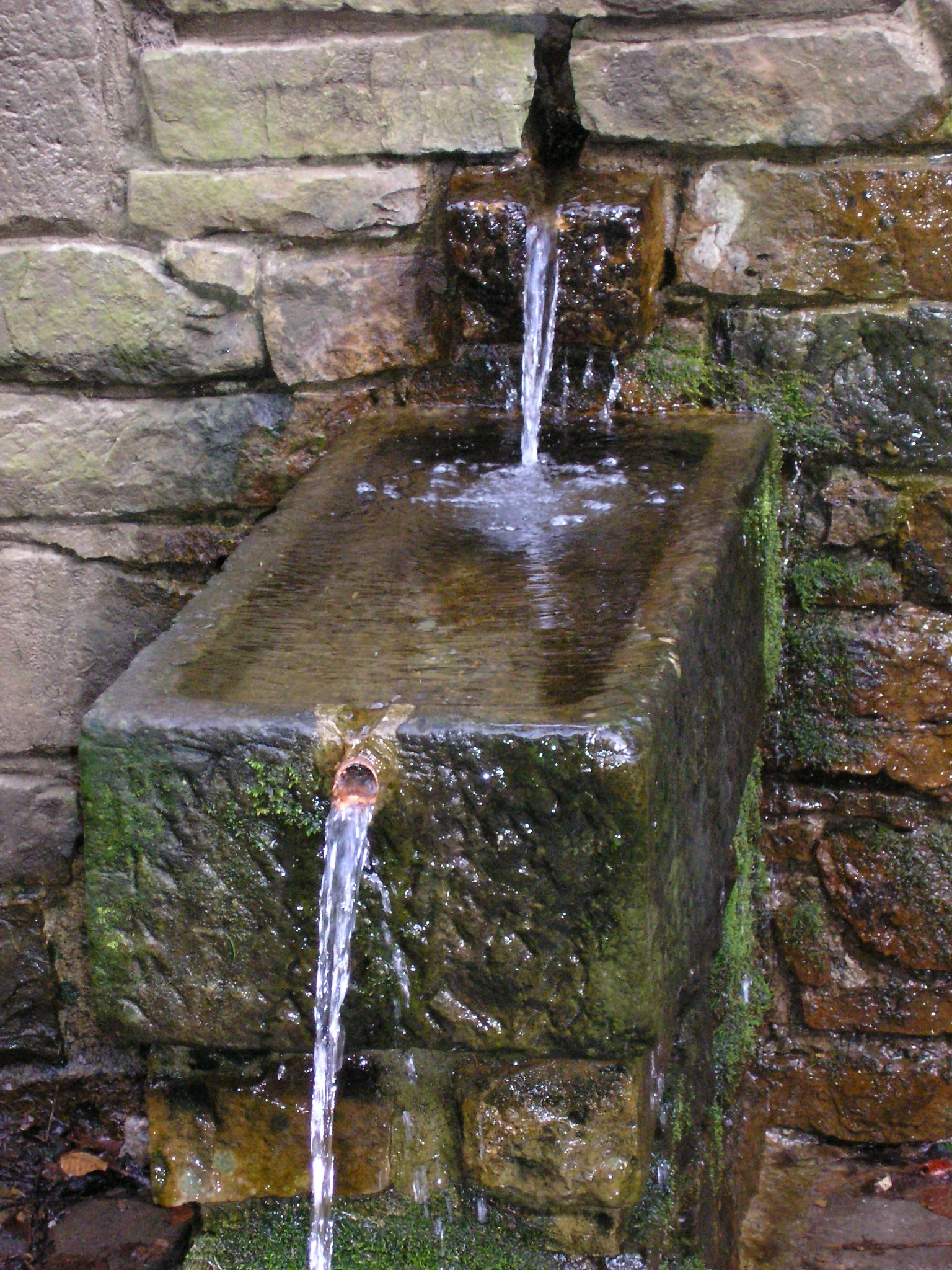
A stream source on the western slope of the Wurzelbrink

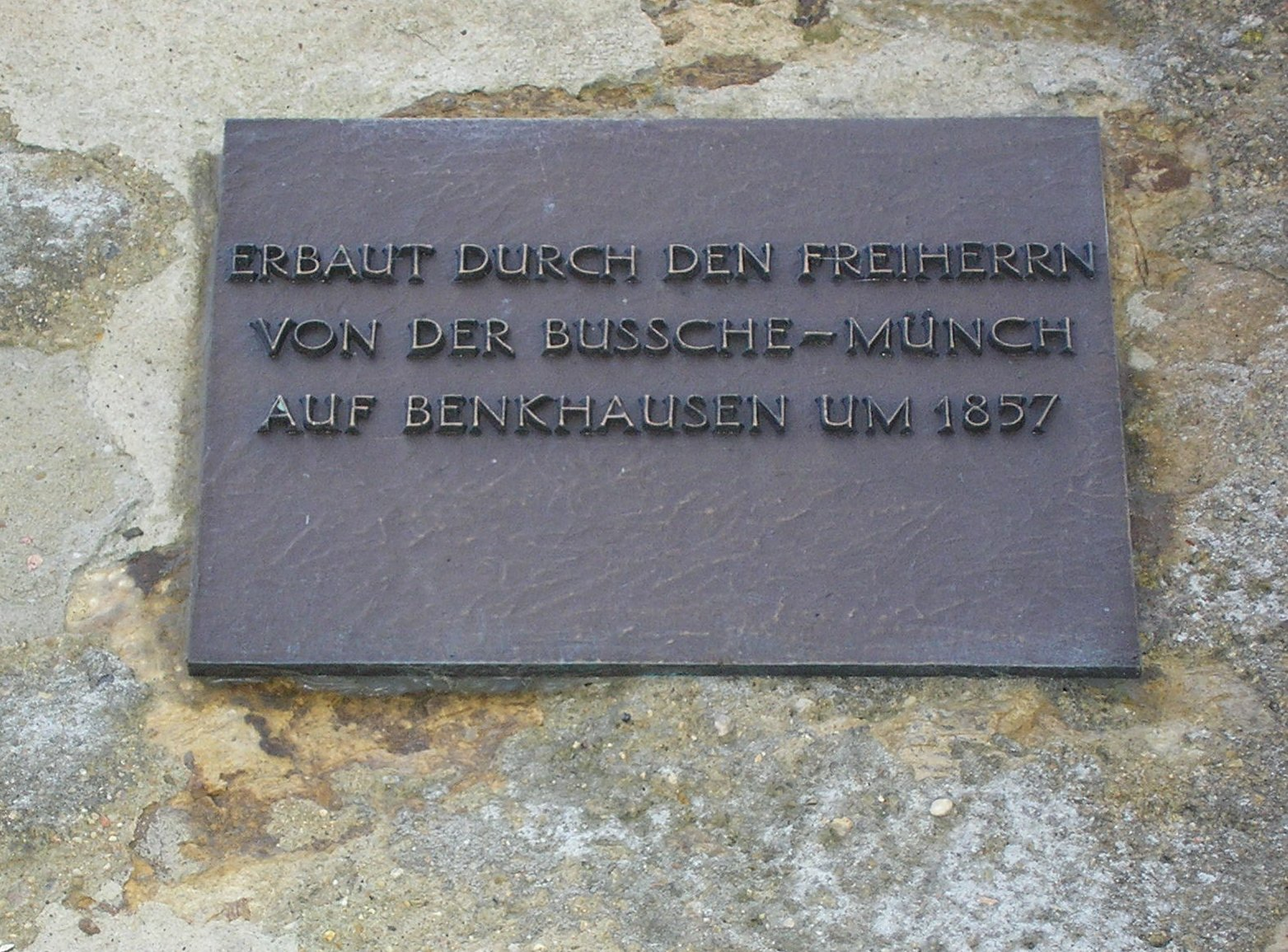
Memorial tablet on the tower
