= Mensinger Ravine =

Steep-sided valley in the Wiehen Hills, Central Germany

Coordinates: 52°17′11″N 8°37′24″E

The Mensinger Ravine (German: Mensinger Schlucht) is a steep-sided valley in the Wiehen Hills in Central Germany that is situated on the territory of the town of Lübbecke in the district of Minden-Lübbecke. The ravine begins on the eastern slopes of the Wurzelbrink hill and runs northwards from there in a curve as far as the B 239 federal road. The ravine is around 800 metres long. The valley floor in its upper section lies at a height of around 210 m above NN and drops to 150 m above NN at the end of the valley, where the source of the Ronceva stream is found. In the ravine itself, although it was formed by erosive influences, there is no permanent stream - only during heavy rainfall at the "upper reaches of the Ronceva", so to speak, does any water flow. The valley floor itself is impassable on foot in places. However, immediately to the east is a forest track, that enables the valley to be walked from end to end in 15 minutes. The ravine is forested throughout.

The Mensinger Ravine is a typical example of a Siepe, a narrow, wet, ravine-like, V-shaped valley in higher hills or low mountains with a source stream. (in the East Westphalian region of Ravensberg Land and in the Lipperland such a terrain feature is known as a Siek). The source streams in such a valley do not necessarily carry water all-year round, as in the case of that in the Mensiger Ravine, however, the stream is the reason the V-shaped valley was formed. It must however be taken into account for terrain shaping, that in the post ice age the water levels flowing out of the mountain ranges, including the Wiehen, were greater, so that streams were able to cut into the terrain much more than they do today. This is the reason the ravine is so deep despite the rather low levels of water flow on the ravine floor today.

== See also ==
- List of canyons
