= Heidbrink =

Hill in Germany

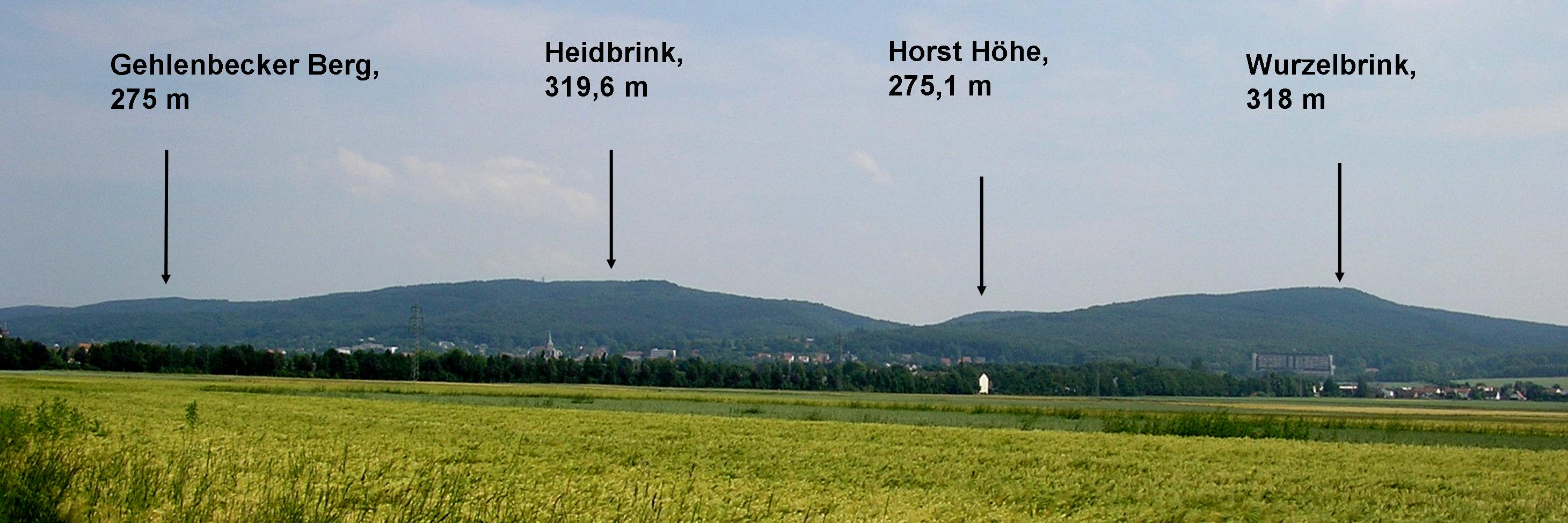
- The Heidbrink and its neighbouring peaks seen from the north

Highest point
- Elevation: 319.6 m above sea level (1,049 ft)
- Prominence: 240 m ↓ Hase-Else bifurcation near Gesmold → Auf dem Polle (320.1 m, Teutoburg Forest northwest of Oerlinghausen)
- Isolation: 26 km → Bonstapel in the Lippe Uplands
- Listing: Highest peak in the Wiehen
- Coordinates: 52.2914°N 8.6369°E

Geography
- Location within North Rhine-Westphalia
- Location: South of Lübbecke, Germany
- Parent range: Wiehen Hills

Climbing
- Normal route: Footpath

The Heidbrink is a hill which lies south of Lübbecke in central Germany and, at 319.6 m above sea level (NN), is the highest peak in the Wiehen Hills. It is also the highest elevation in the district of Minden-Lübbecke in the German state of North Rhine-Westphalia. Its height is commonly given as 320 metres.

About 200 yards east of the summit is a transmission tower for television and radio links and a wayside hut for walkers. The mast has a paved access road from the B 239.

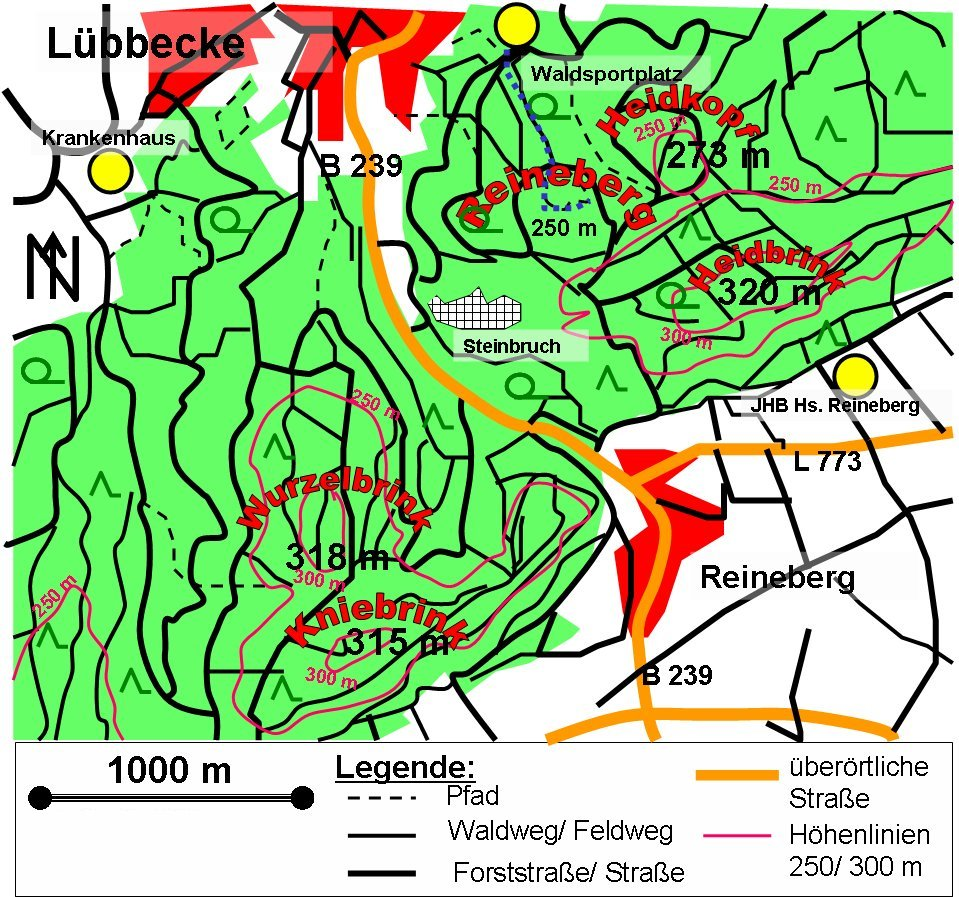
The Heidbrink lies south of Lübbecke

The summit of the Heidbrink itself is in a small open area and, until 2008, was marked by a boulder. Due to the surrounding high trees the view is blocked to the north; to the south can parts of the Ravensberg Basin be seen.

The Ronceva rises on the western slope of the mountain. To the north are the peaks of the Reineberg, 276 m above sea level, and the Heidkopf, 273 m. The southern flank of the mountain drops steeply to the hamlet of Ahlsen-Reineberg in the municipality of Hüllhorst.

The ridgeway (Kammweg) passes over the top of the mountain. It forms the boundary between the town of Lübbecke and the municipality of Hüllhorst. The ridgeway runs as a footpath (the Wittekindsweg) along the Wiehen ridge from Osnabrück to Porta Westfalica, and links the Heidbrink with the Straußberg (276 m) in the east, and the Horsthöhe (275 m) and Kniebrink (315 m) in the west.

To mark the highest point on the Heidbrink a five-ton sandstone block with strong iron deposits, typical of the local Wiehen Hills, was set up on 24 May 2008. According to information boards by the TERRA.vita Nature Park, members of the Lübbecke marketing association (Stadtmarketingverein) and the municipal curator of Hüllhorst have marked the route to the "highest stone" with their own symbol. These are sometimes signposts, sometimes coloured markings, on wayside tree trunks. The symbol, the letter "H" on a hill symbol, is meant to be linked with the name and the appearance of the hill.

At the new summit stone are two tablets; the upper one describes the Heidbrink as the highest hill in the Wiehen range; the lower panel lists the sponsors of this marketing campaign.

The new summit stone is not in the same place as the old and rather less imposing summit stone, but about 20 metres east. The original stone was removed during the work to set up the new one. But it appears that the original spot had marked the exact peak, but was not so obviously recognisable from the main footpath.

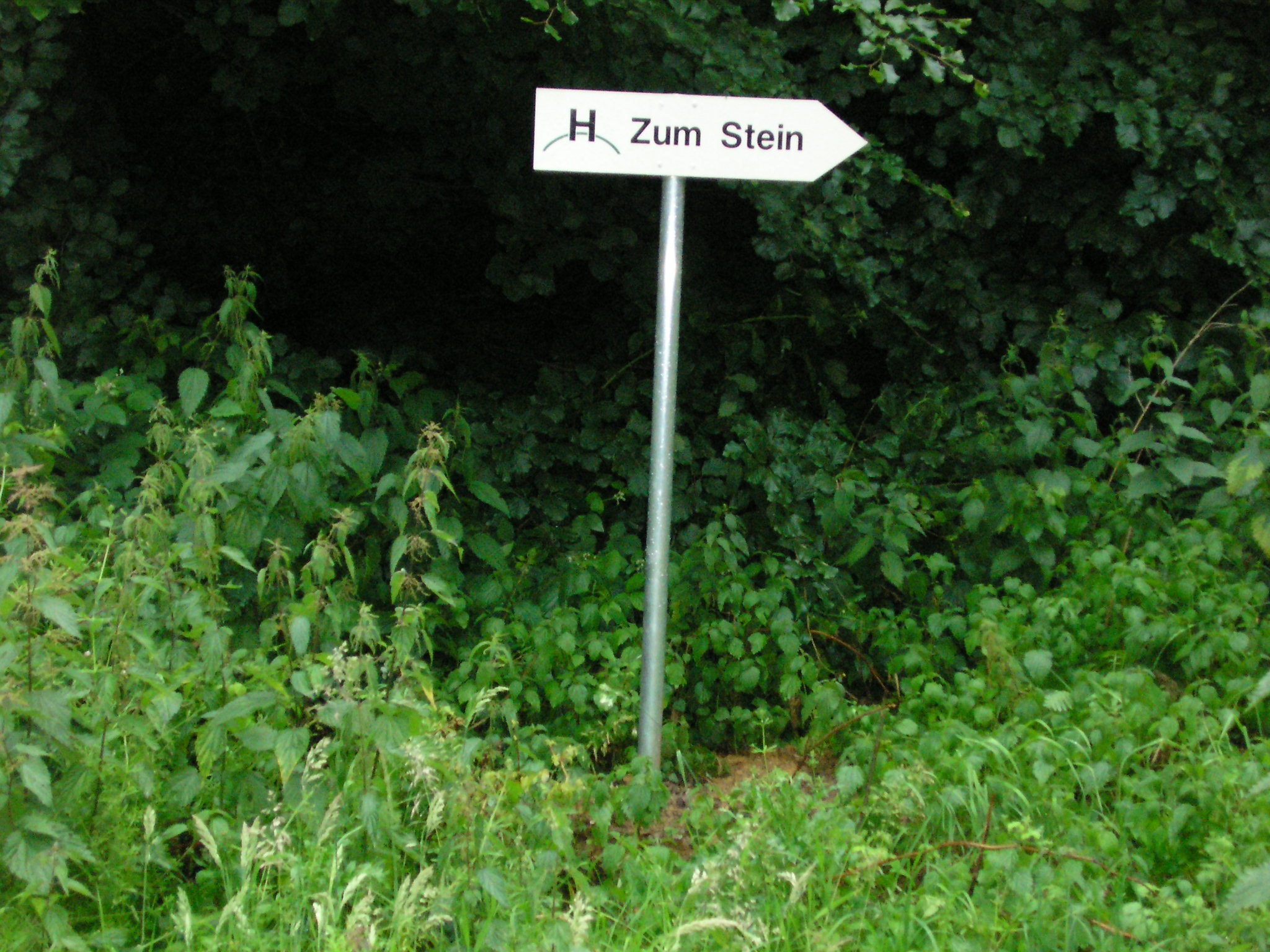
Since spring 2008 these signposts have pointed the way to the summit of the Heidbrink

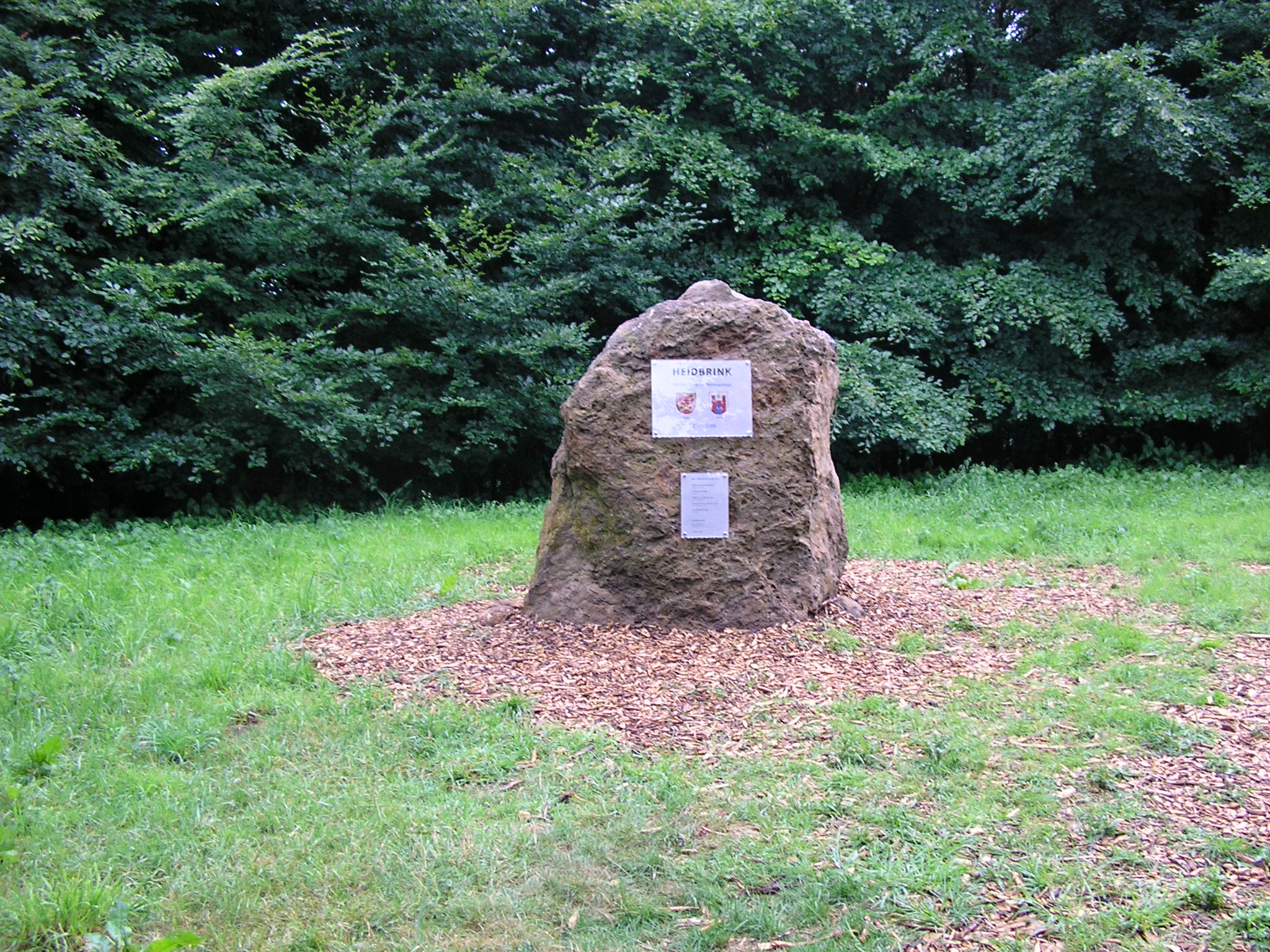
This stone has stood at the summit since May 2008

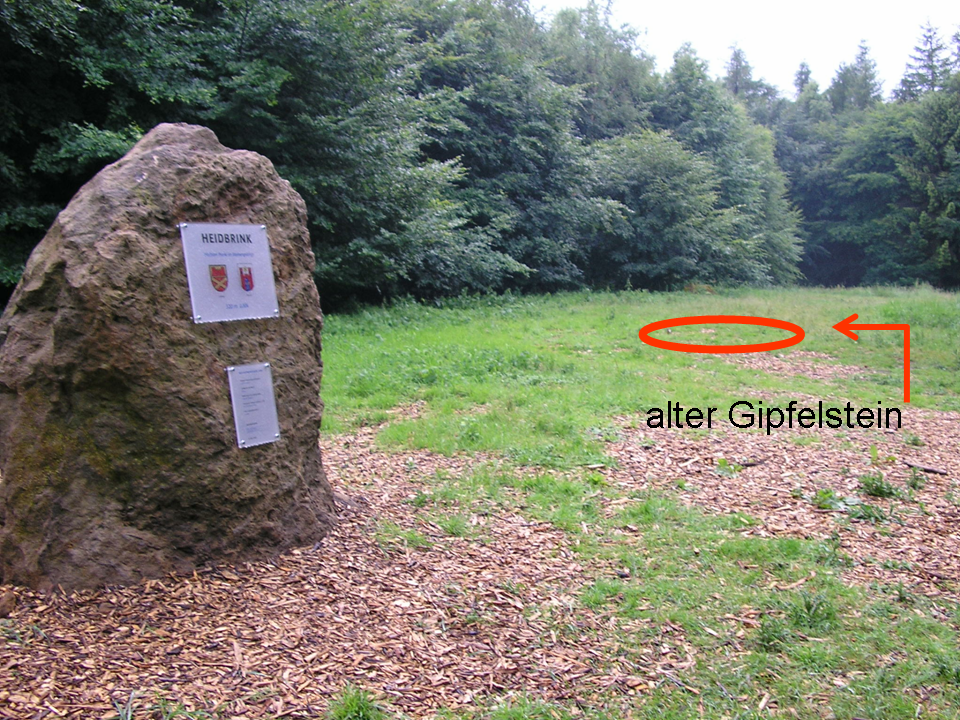
The site of the original summit stone was somewhat further west as shown here and marks the actual peak

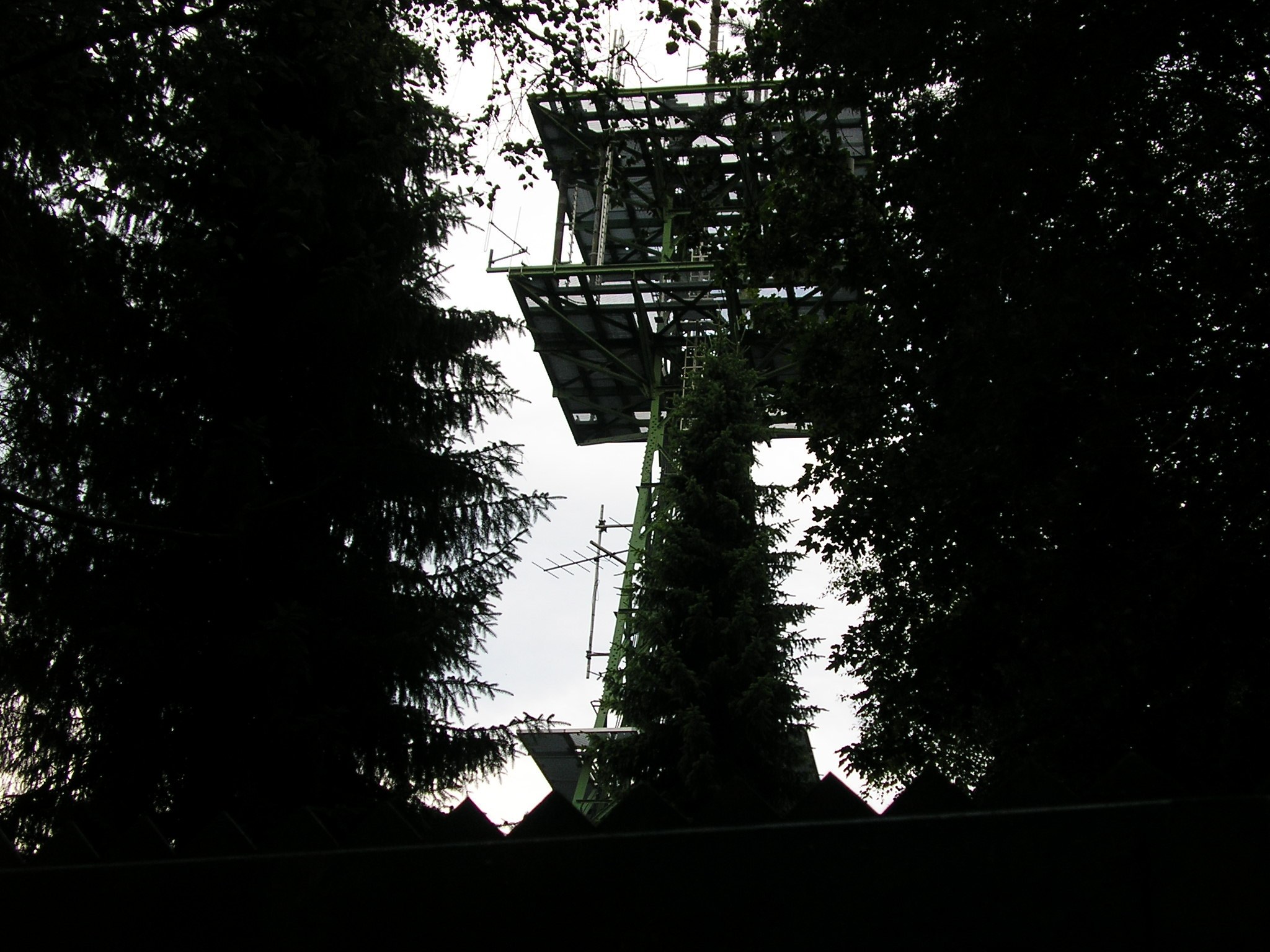
100 metres east of the actual peak is this transmission tower
