= Kniebrink =

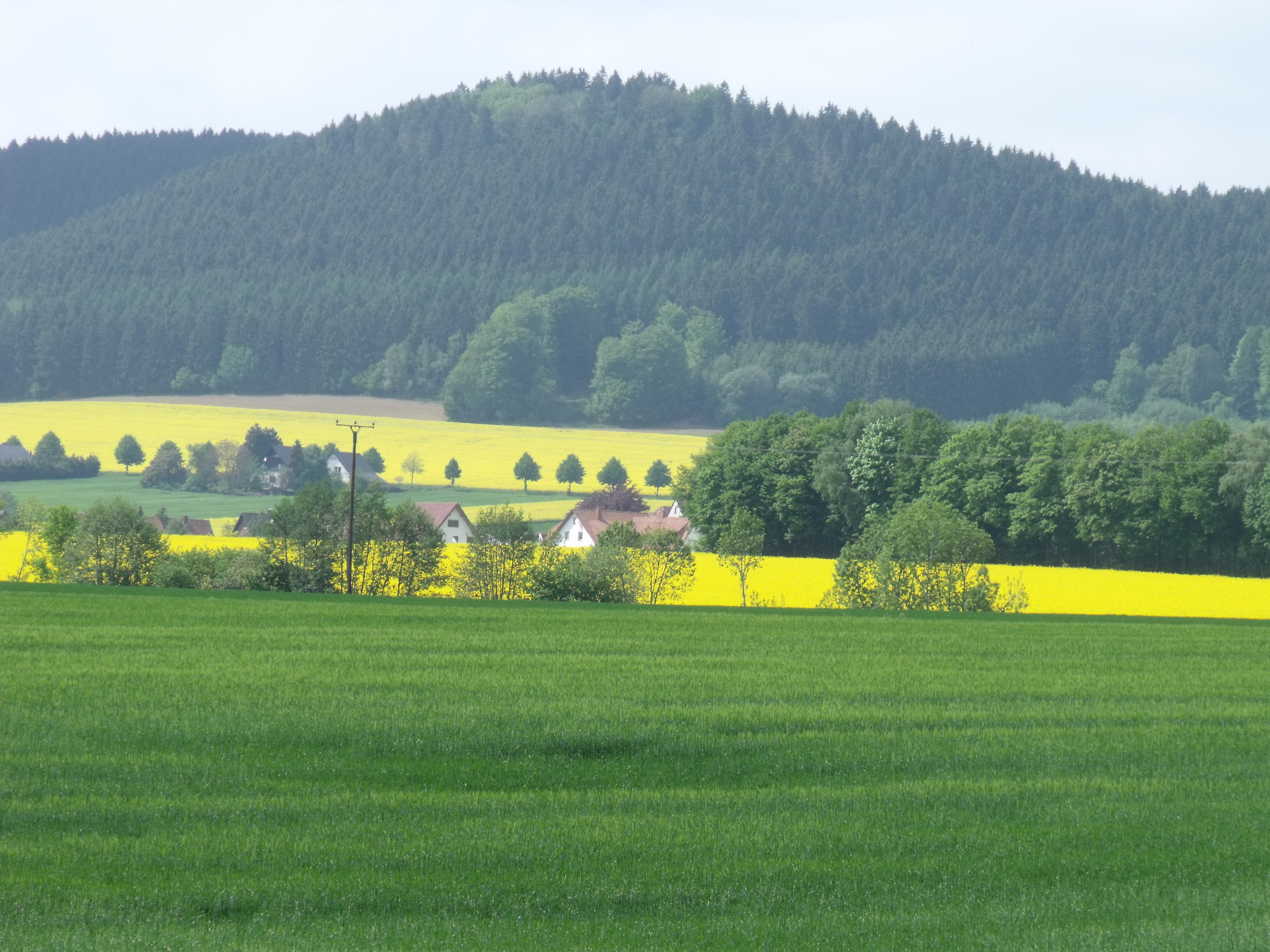
- The Kniebrink seen from the south

Highest point
- Elevation: 315 m above sea level (NN) (1,033 ft)
- Coordinates: 52°17′49″N 8°39′22″E

Geography
- Location within North Rhine-Westphalia
- Location: North Rhine-Westphalia, Germany
- Parent range: Wiehengebirge

The Kniebrink, at 315 m above sea level (NN), is the third highest mountain in the northern German Wiehen Hills. Its immediate summit belongs administratively to the village of Oberbauerschaft in the municipality of Hüllhorst. However, its boundary with the town of Lübbecke runs just north of the summit, so that its northern slopes belong to Lübbecke.

The Kniebrink is just 3 metres lower than the more northerly Wurzelbrink, which obscures it from view in Lübbecke. The hill is largely trackless. In spring 2007 its trees suffered major storm damage. The top can be reaches from Lübbecke in under 45 minutes. From the south you need about 20 minutes for the short but steep climb.

== Gallery ==
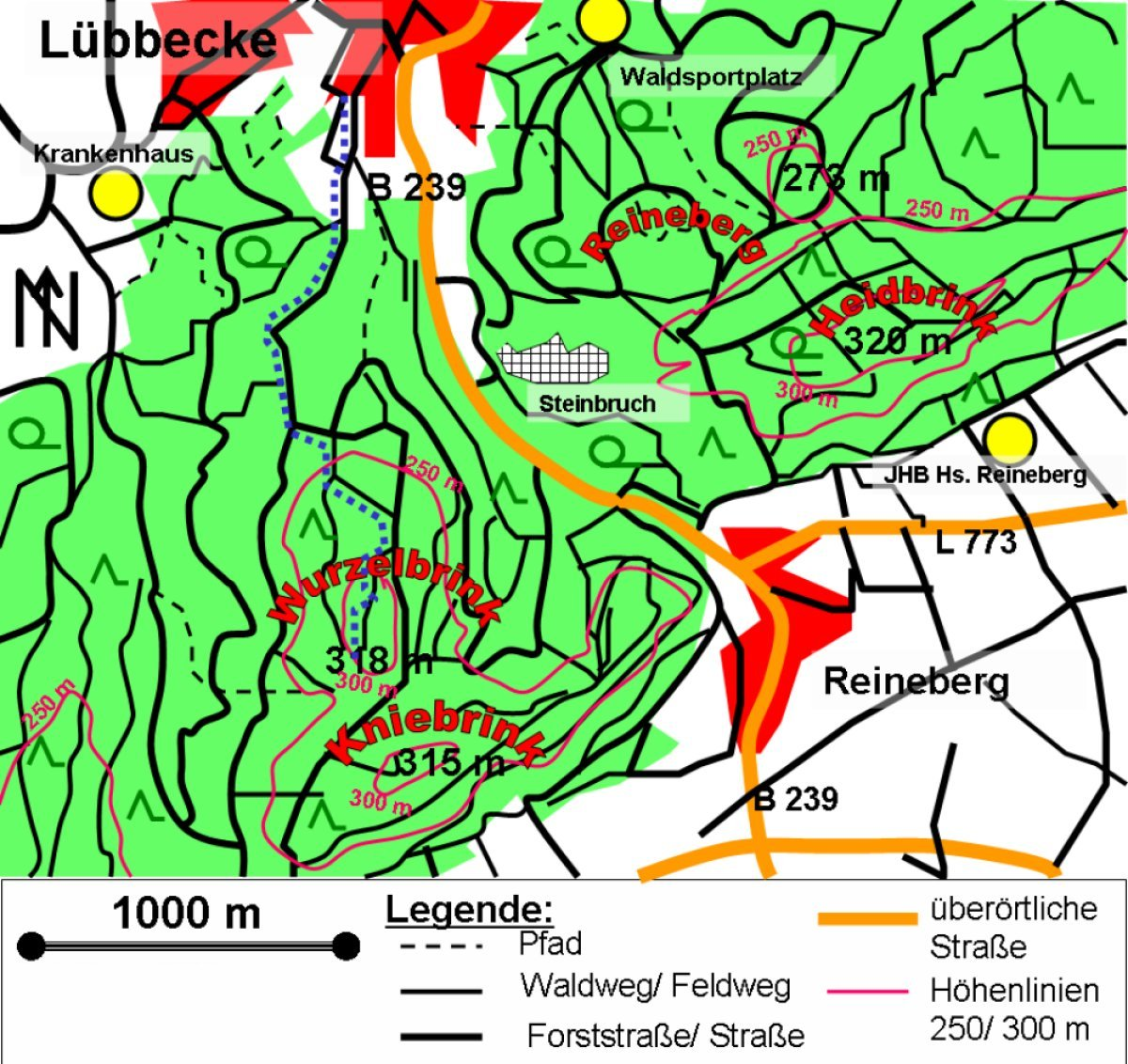
The Kniebrink lies immediately south of the Wurzelbrink

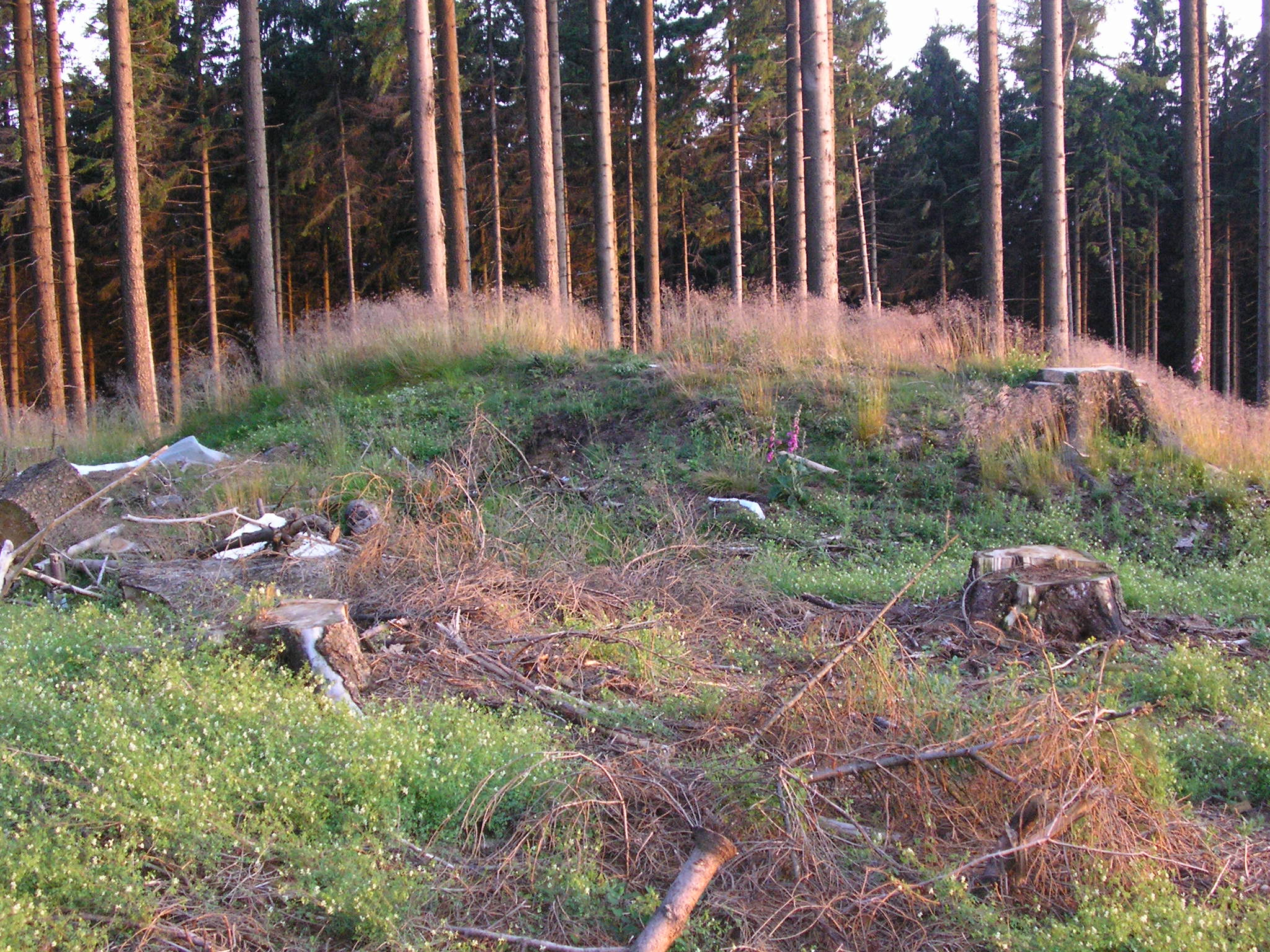
On the treeless summit region, this hillock, the actual peak, is easy to make out

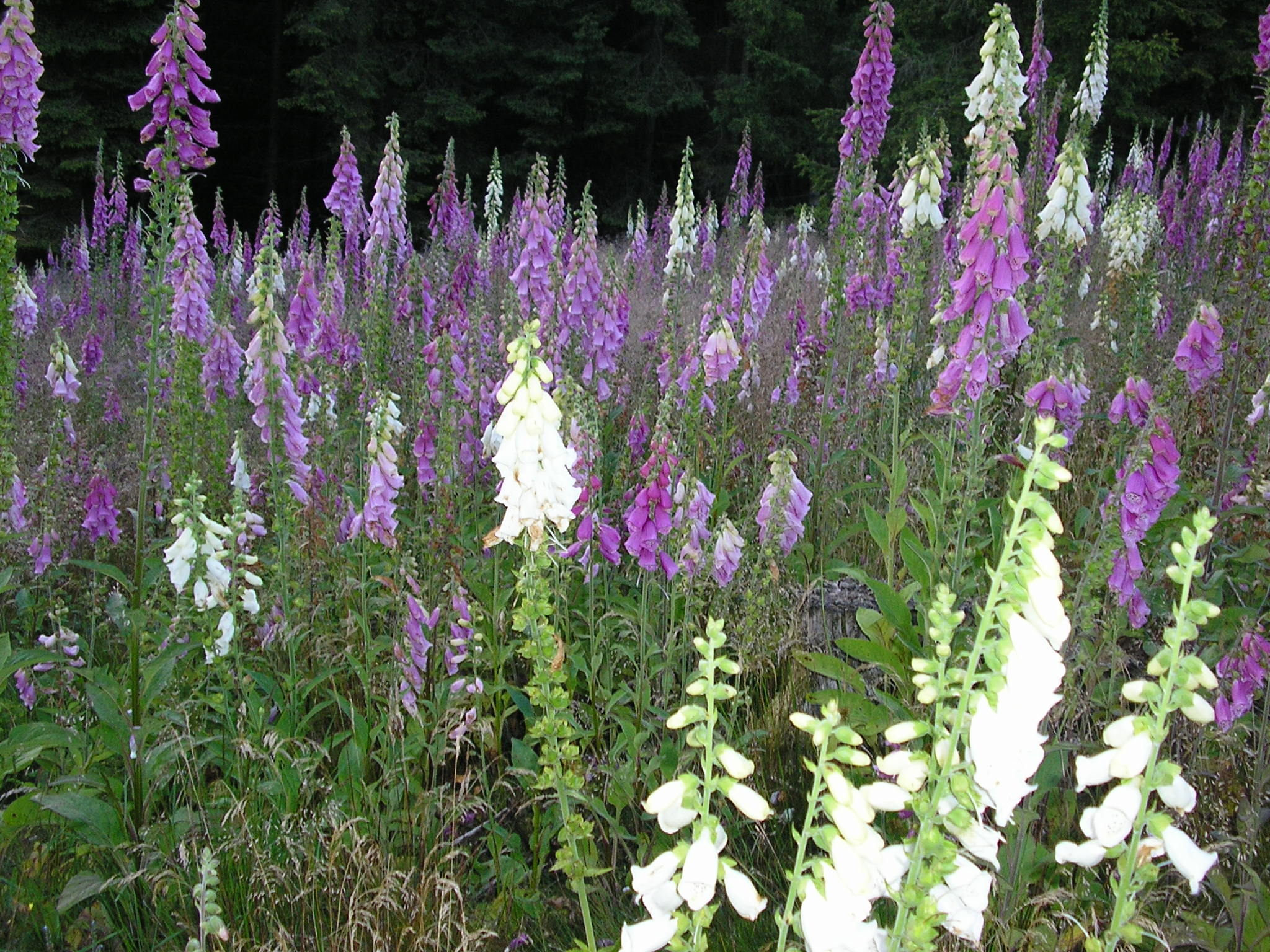
On the summit area, deforested by the storm, there are now clumps of foxglove

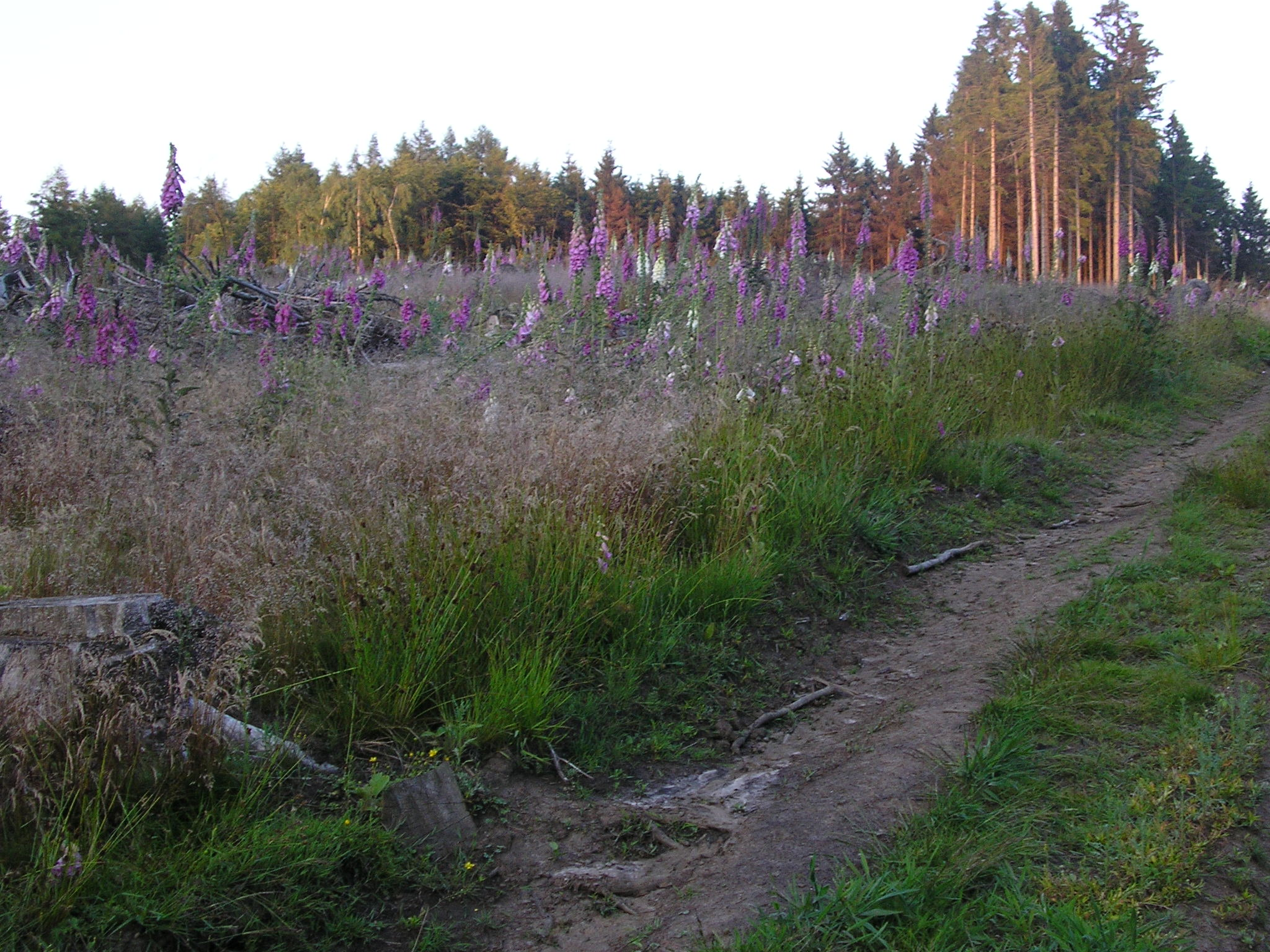
This path leads to the top

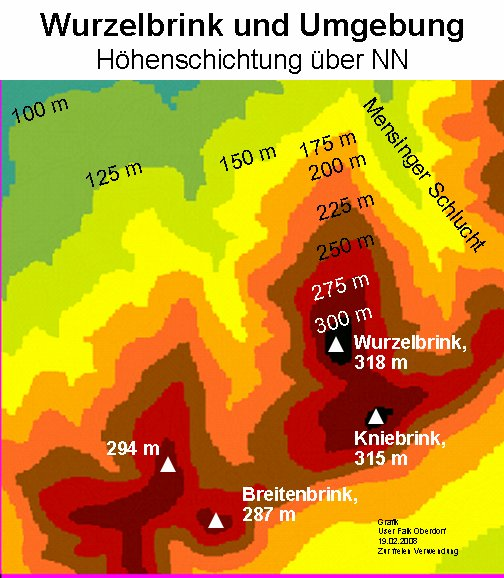
Like the neighbouring Wurzelbrink, the Kniebrink is also over 300m high
