= Reineberg =

Hill in Germany

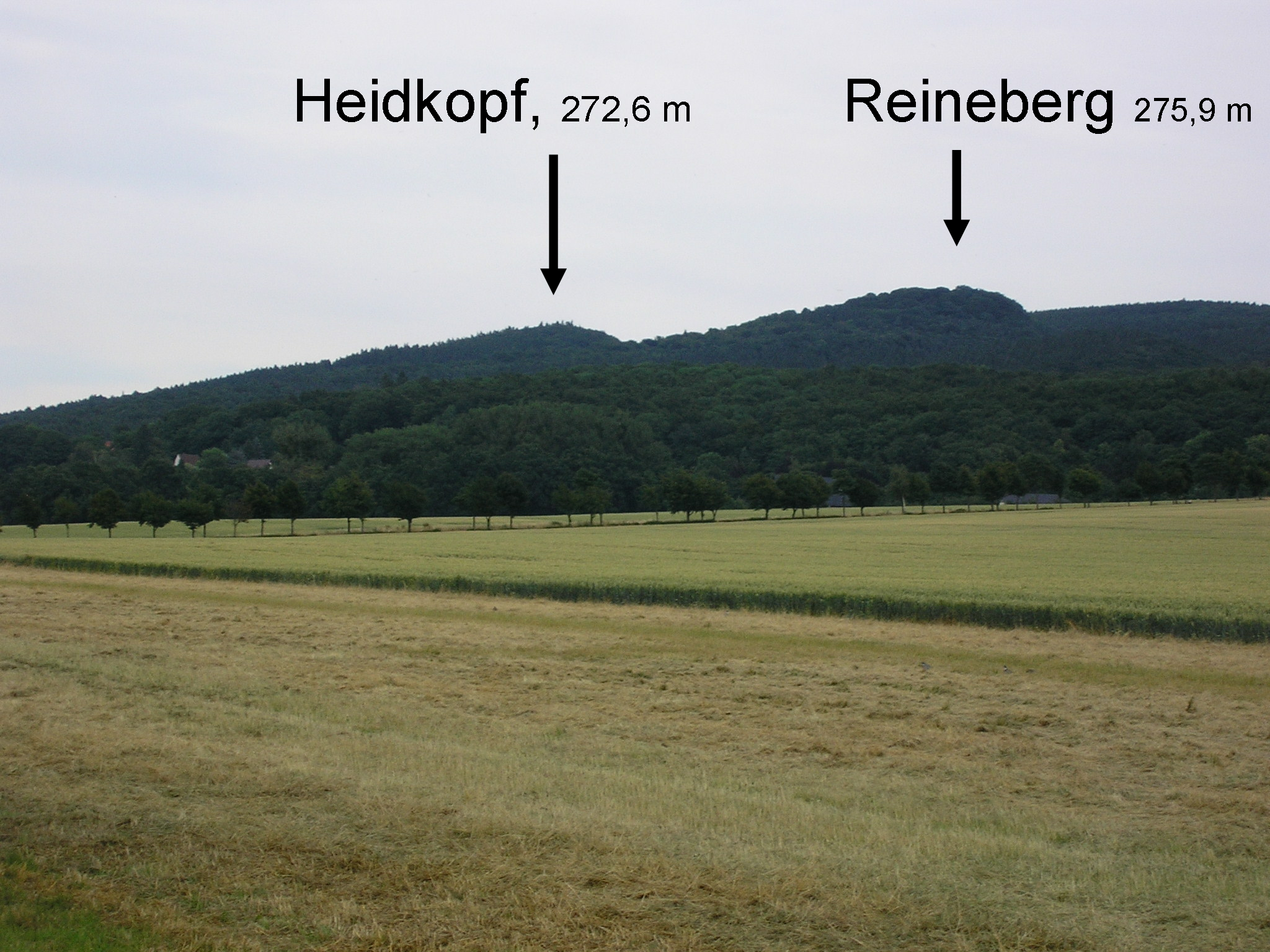
- The Heidkopf and the Reineberg

Highest point
- Elevation: 275.9 m above sea level (NN) (905 ft)
- Coordinates: 52°17′40″N 8°37′42″E

Geography
- Location within North Rhine-Westphalia
- Location: North Rhine-Westphalia, Germany
- Parent range: Wiehen Hills

The Reineberg is a hill on the Wiehen ridge, south of the town of Lübbecke. With a height of 275.9 m above sea level it is, from a topographical point of view, not a particularly impressive eminence in this part of the Wiehen Hills, because, in the immediate vicinity are considerably higher summits, such as the 320 m high Heidbrink just under 1 km to the south. East of the Reinberg on the other side of a valley bottom rises the Heidkopf, west of the Meesenkopf, on the summit of which there was once a fortification. 230 metres southwest of the summit lies the Wittekind Spring, that had a certain importance for the garrison of the castle at the summit, but today is just a small pond by a rock outcrop at the edge of a track. The Reineberg, which is the local hill for the town of Lübbecke, owes its significance to the fact that, until 1723, the year of its demolition, Reineberg Castle (German: Burg Reineberg or Reineburg) stood here.

== History of Reineberg castle (Reineburg) ==
The origins of the country castle (Landesburg) of Reineberg are lost in legend. According to the episcopal chronicler of the town of Minden the founding of the castle goes back to Bishop Conrad I of Rüdenberg (1209–1237). Osnabrück sources report, however, that the Osnabrück bishop, Adolf von Tecklenburg (1216–1224), was the co-founder (Miterbauer).

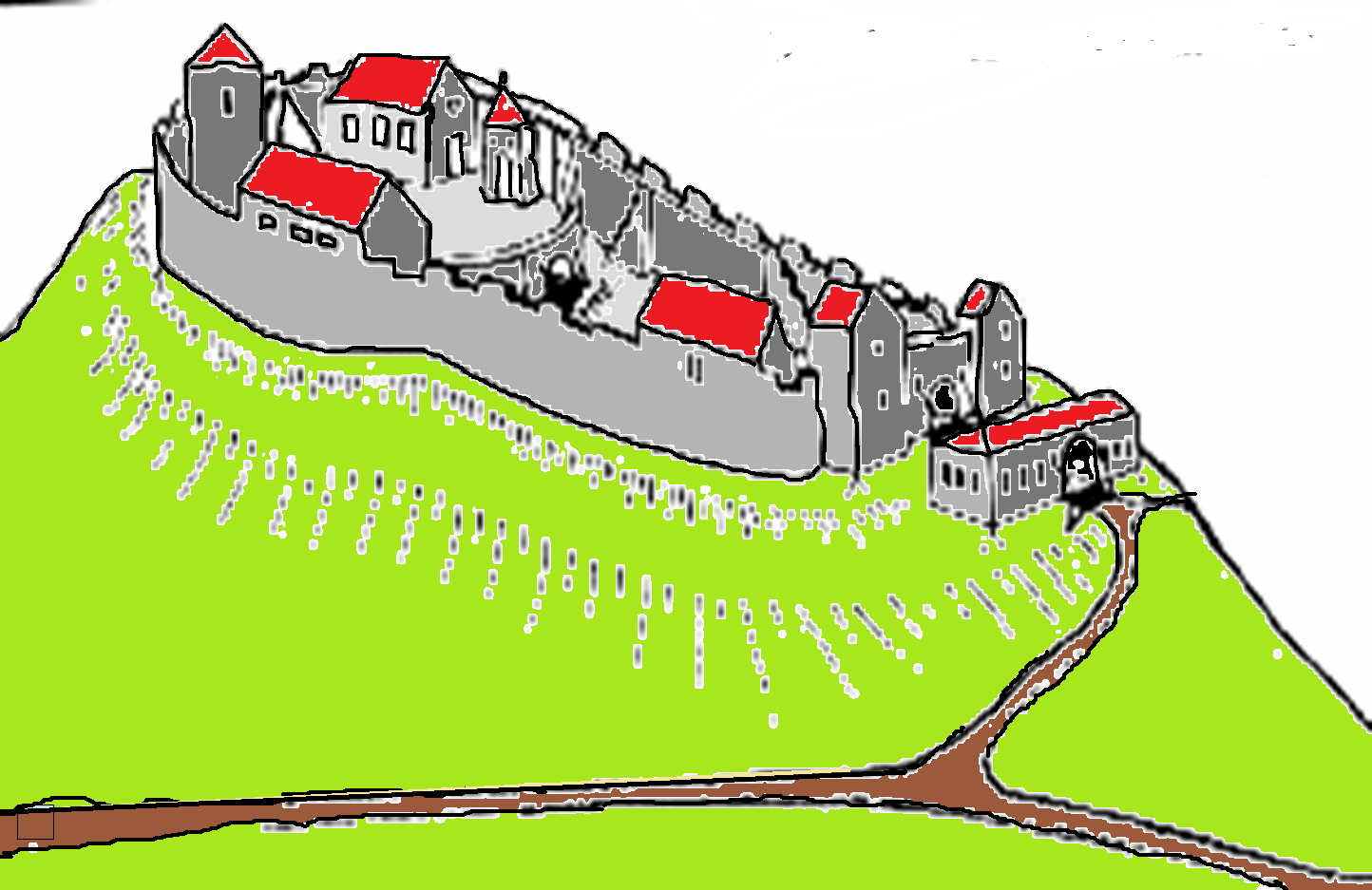
Artist's impression of the castle

In 1271 Reinberg Castle was first mentioned in the records. In the outgoing years of the 13th century the bishops of Osnabrück and Minden were the common owners of the castle. Reineberg Castle acted as a fortified base of power for the bishops of Minden. Their intent was to hold their own against the Bishop of Osnabrück, the counts of Tecklenburg and the lords (Edelherren) of Diepholz. Later their importance grew even more through the expansion of the governance of the territory. Reineberg Castle was, as mentioned, according to a treaty of 1306, initially in the common ownership of the neighbouring prince-bishops of Minden and Osnabrück.

In 1412 we find the knight (Ritter), Dietrich von Münchhausen, as the tenant of the castle, in a dispute with his landlord, Bishop Wulbrand, and the cathedral chapter of Minden, because he had enfeoffed the Reineberg without permission to Count Nicholas II of Tecklenburg. The bishop protested and besieged the castle. Tecklenburg troops advanced to do battle, but were driven off by Lübbecke's townsfolk with support from the seneschal (Drost) of Limberg, Allhard von dem Busche. Attempts by Tecklenburg, to gain ownership of the castle were thus foiled.

Reineberg Castle was turned into a strong fortress according to a contemporary account by the Minden cathedral canon, Tribbe, dating to the 15th century.

Like almost all castles of this type the Reineburg was often enfeoffed due to its landlord's chronic shortage of money. Around 1525 we find Johann Tribbe as the seneschal of Reineburg. In 1543 the castle was enfeoffed to a widow, Clara of Hatzfeld, and her sons Meinolf and Joachim. Hardly had Bishop George come to power in 1554, when he issued the order to redeem all the enfeoffed castles in his diocese. This therefore also affected the then tenant, Hilmar von Quernheim. He wished to retain his fief however and was actually given an extension of several years until the bishop finally rescinded it in spring 1564. Because Hilmar von Quernheim did not respond, the bishop had the castle stormed on 2 May.

But by 1567 Hilmar was again enfeoffed with the castle for twelve years following a treaty. During the Thirty Years' War the castle was badly damaged again and plundered three times: in 1636, 1638 and 1640.

On 9 September 1636, Imperial Staff Sergeant (Oberwachtmeister) Heister, had the entire record office on the Reineberge burned. On 28 March 1673 Münster troops captured Lübbecke and Reineberg in the course of the Franco-Dutch War, because Brandenburg was allied with the Netherlands. Then all fell quite around the old episcopal castle - the Principality of Minden being awarded to Brandenburg as part of the Peace of Westphalia in 1648. In 1719, Frederick William I decreed the union of the County of Ravensberg with Minden, and this was followed, from 1723 to 1808, by the establishment of the Chamber of War and Estates (Kriegs- und Domänenkammer) in Minden as a regional oversight of the administrations of the five Minden and eight Ravensberg districts or Ämter. The Reineburg was now enfeoffed several times together with its associated Amt and was under the command of the Prussian king, Frederick William I. In 1723 it was demolished due to its dilapidated condition. The remaining usable material was used in the construction of the government building in Minden and also for the new Amt office in the Reineberger Felde (called zum Siek), where several domestic buildings already existed.

Finally the castle came under the general influence of the Bishop of Minden and became a Minden state castle or Landesburg. The fortifications in front of the castle show signs of medieval siege technology. The castle estate developed into the Minden Amt of Reineberg, which later became the Amt of Hüllhorst. Of the rudimentary remains of this castle site only the castle moat is still visible on the summit. it is 310 metres long and between 15 and 22 metres wide.

== Legend of the Reineberg ==
It is said of the Reineberg that the Saxon prince, Wittekind, who was suffering from leprosy, "came from the Limberge, reached the spring of Linderung on the western side, went from there to the Reineberg and was cleansed there. Whence the Reineberg received its name" (rein = pure, clean). In this spring is supposed to be an underground vault with a magic entrance in which "King Weking's silver cradle stands".

== Today ==
Today the Reineberg falls within the borough of Lübbecke, but once belonged to the Amt of Reineberg, later Hüllhorst. The old Amt of Reineberg or Amt Reineberger Feld existed from 1723 to 1807 and belonged to the Prussian Principality of Minden. Even today the Reineberg is the name of a village in the collective municipality of Hüllhorst south of the Wiehen Hills (Ahlsen-Reineberg). This municipality has a depiction of the Reineburg in its coat of arms.

In 1951 an official survey of the visible remains of the castle was carried out. Local historian, Professor Langewische from Bünde, discovered that the Reineburg once had five outer baileys.

From the southern edge of the town of Lübbecke, e. g. from the Waldstadion (stadium), the Reineberg may be reached on foot in 15–20 minutes. The parth around the Reinberg is about 1.1 kilometres long.

== Gallery ==
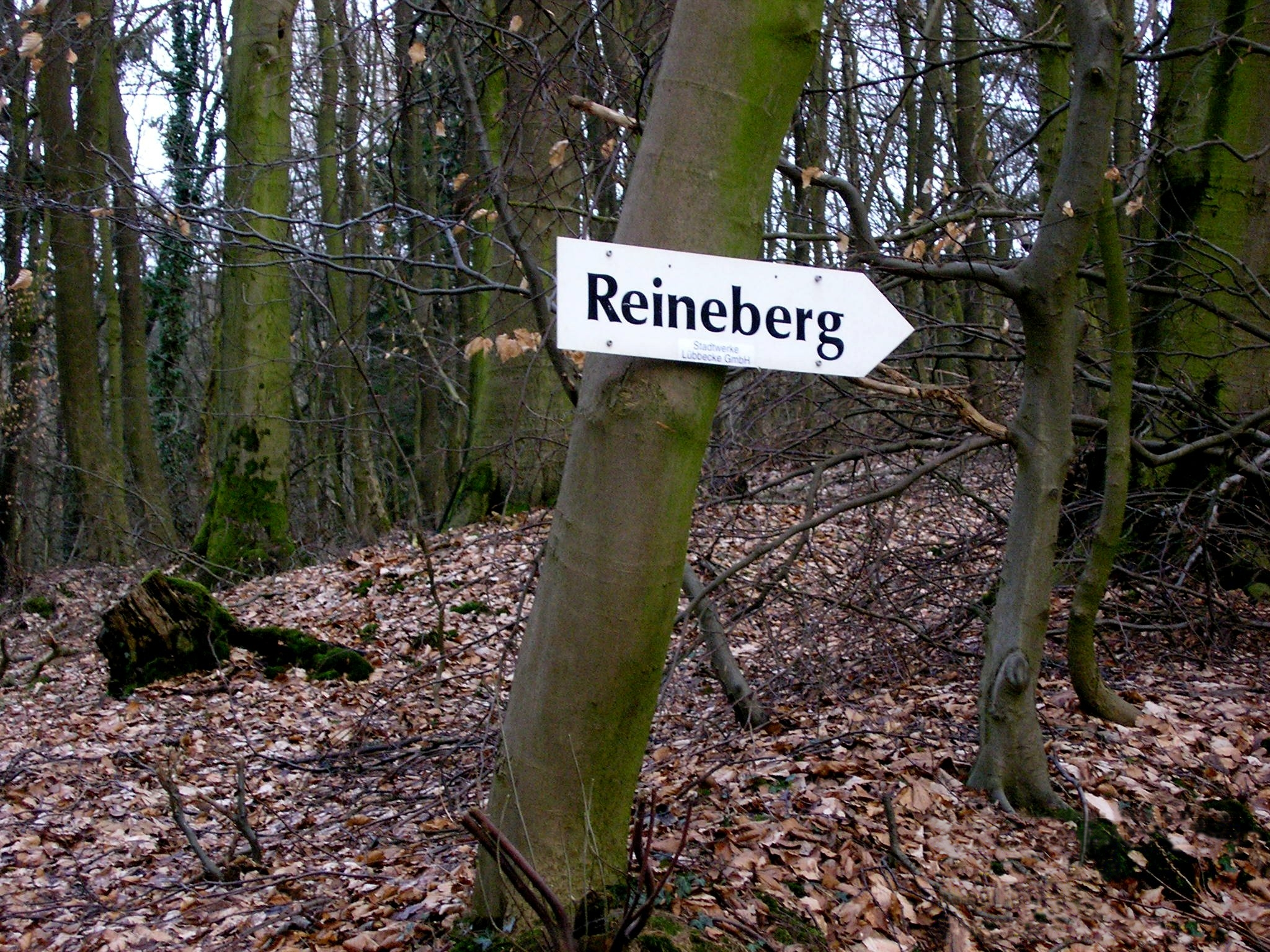
In the immediate vicinity of the summit a signpost points out the final section of the climb.

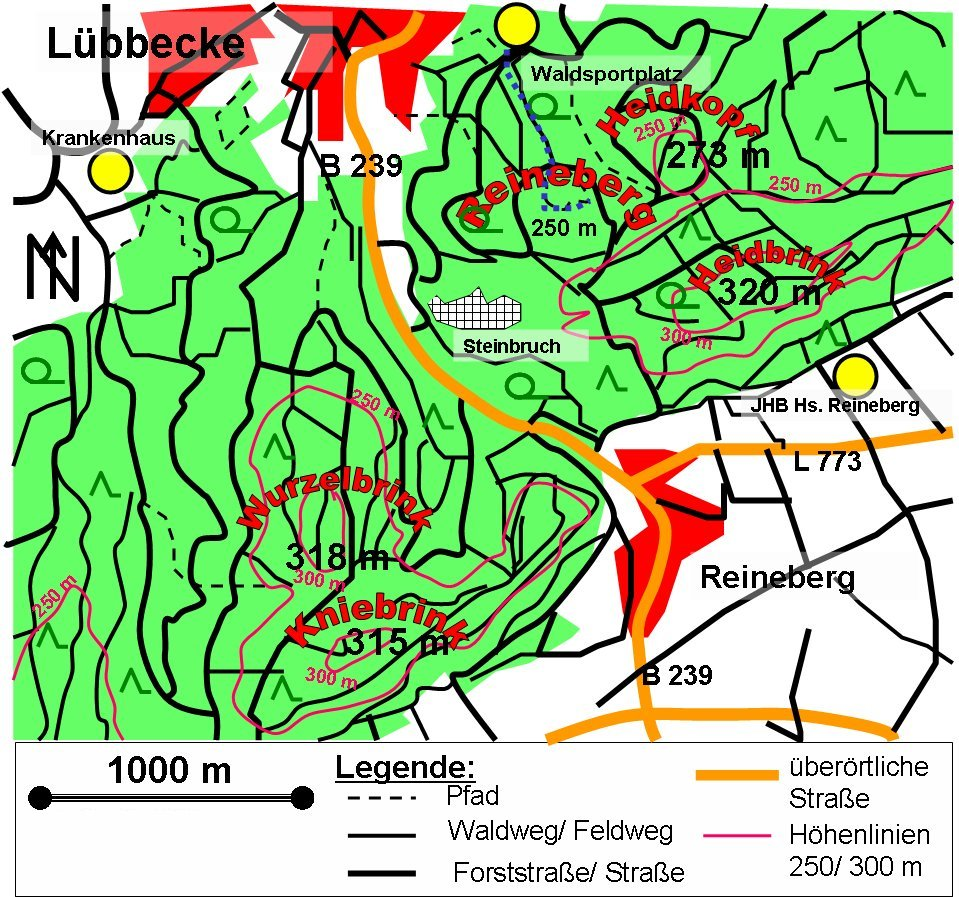
From the woodland sports field (Waldsportplatz) in Lübbecke you can reach the summit in c. 10–15 min heading due south

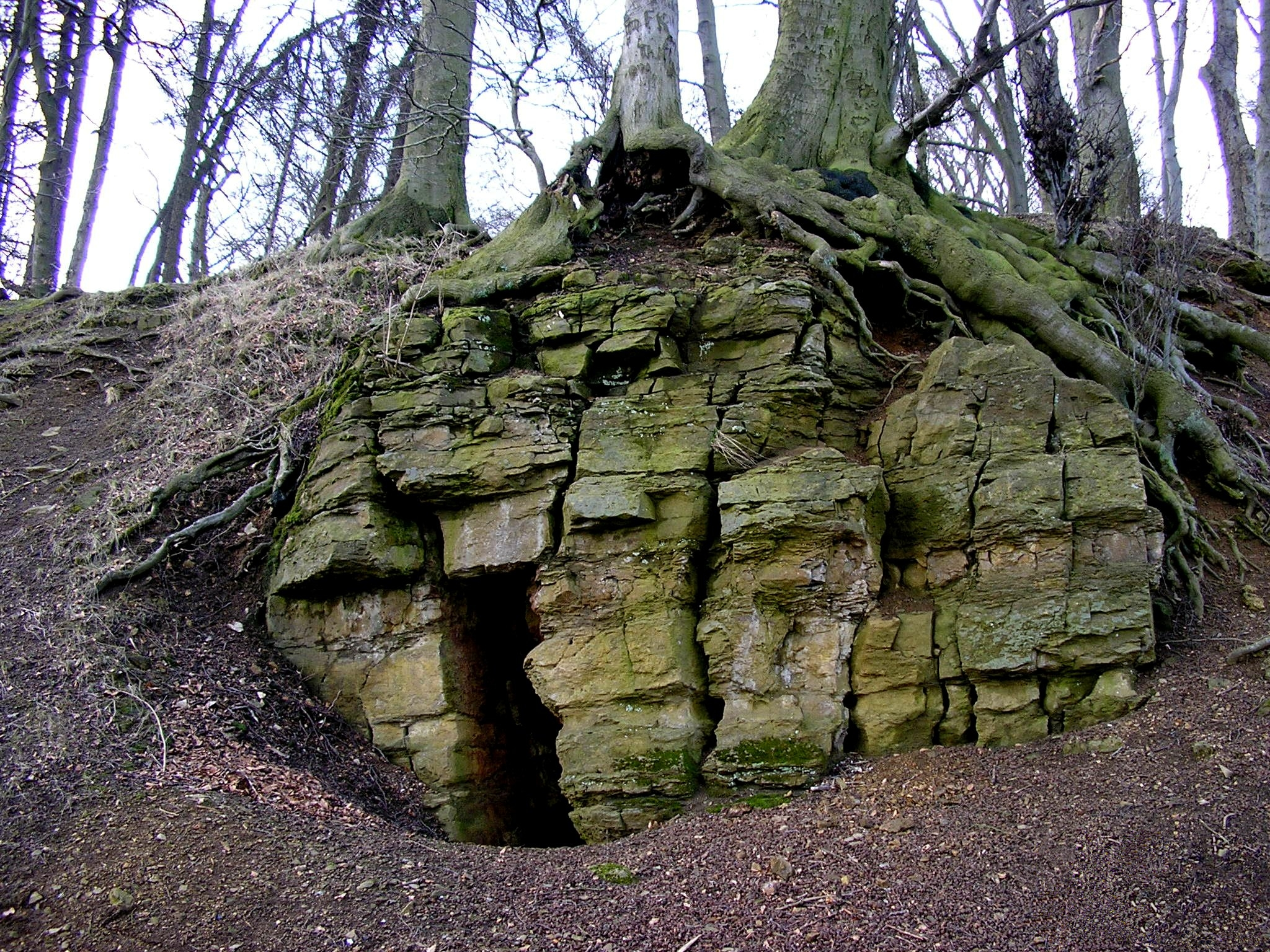
Jurassic rock on the Reineberg

The Reineburg is depicted today in the coat of arms of Hüllhorst

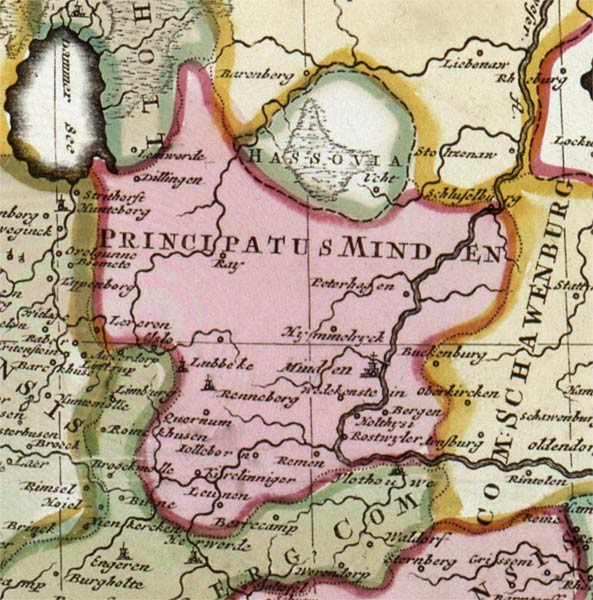
Historic map with the location of Reineberg Castle

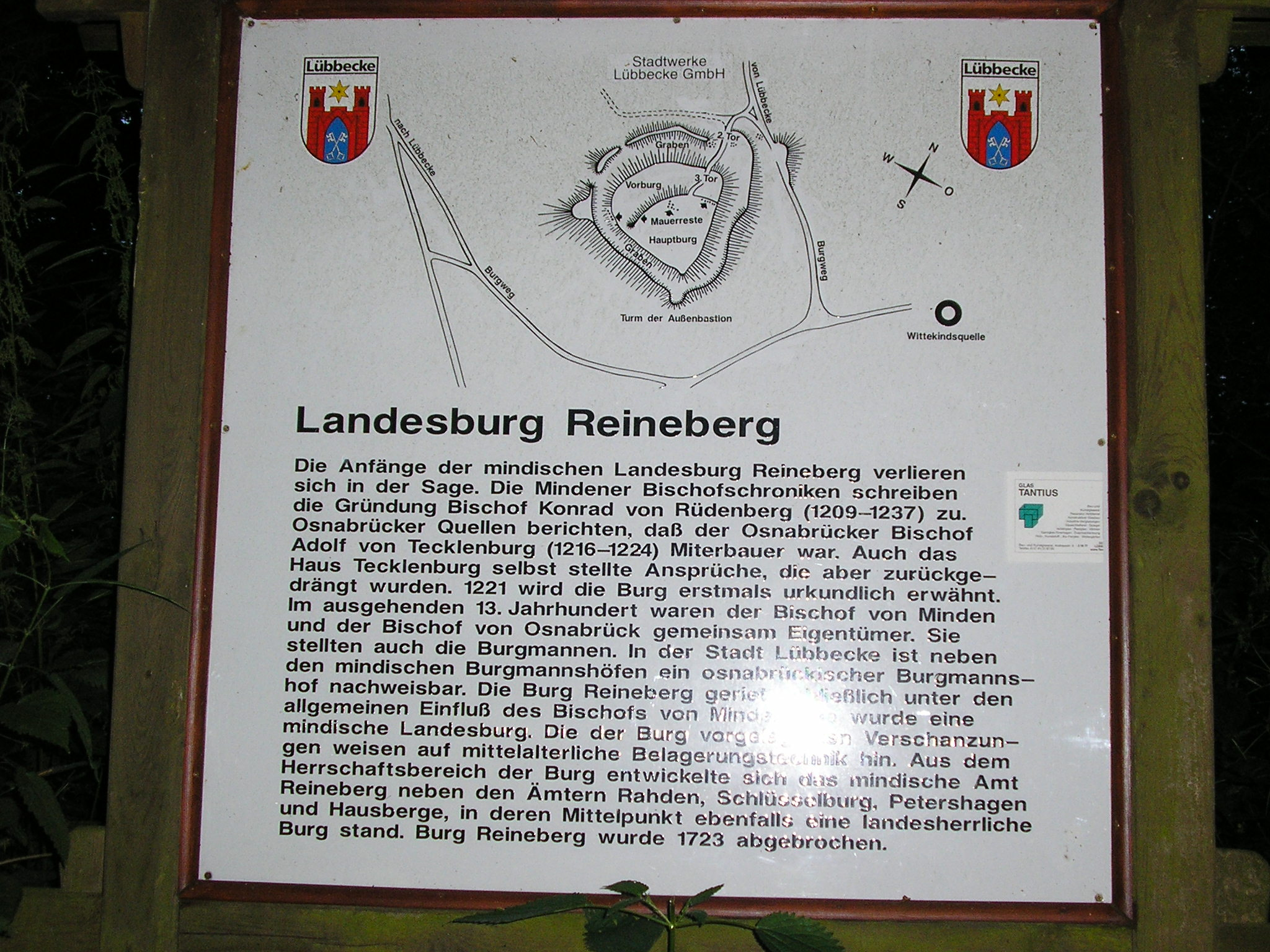
Information board near the summit

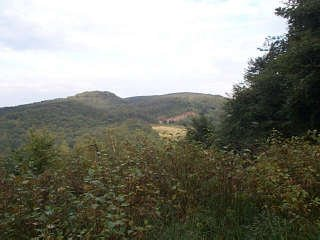
View of the Reineberg (left hill) from the neighbouring Wurzelbrink

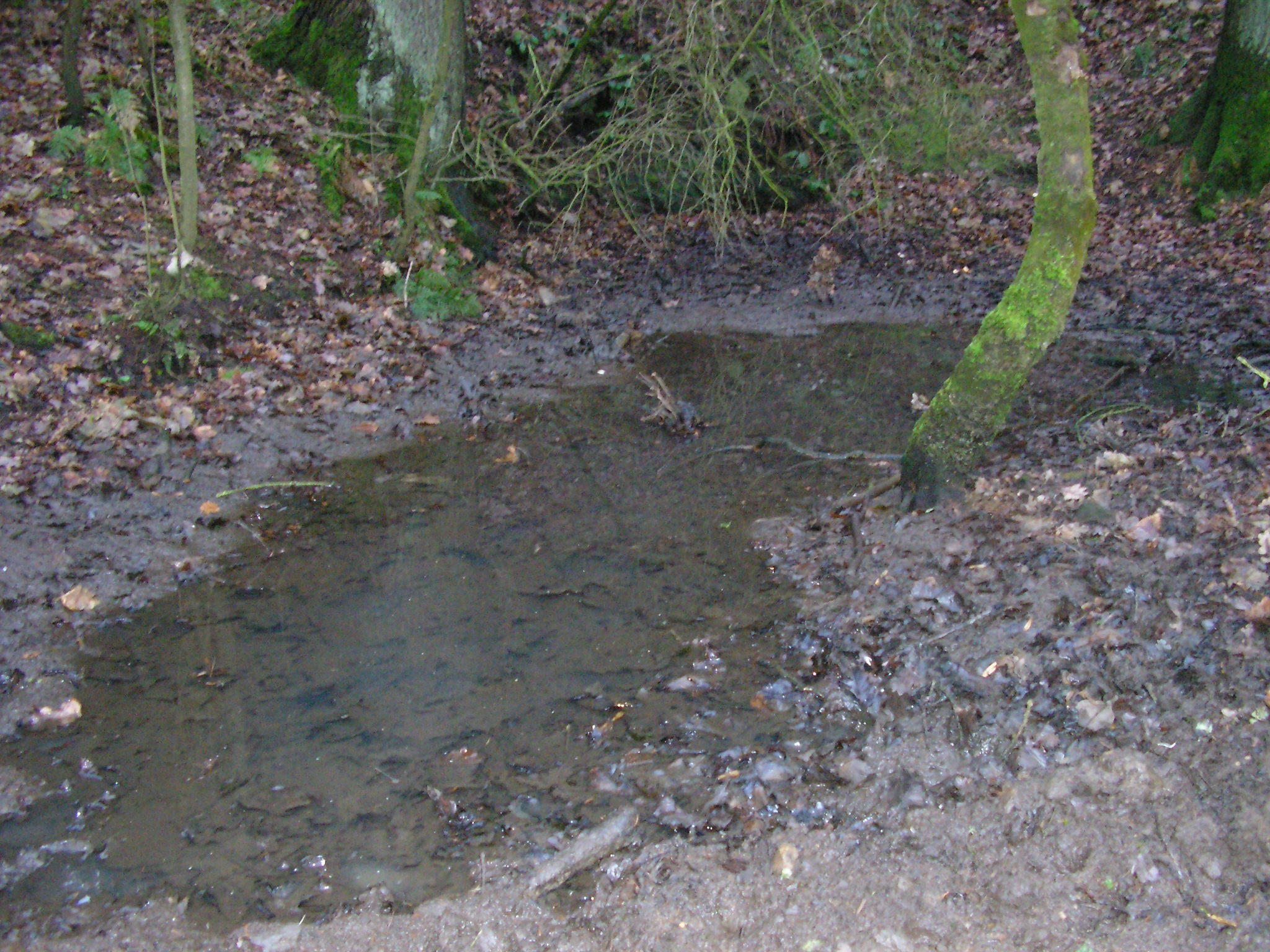
The Wittekind Spring not far from the summit
