= Lübbecke =

Town in North Rhine-Westphalia, German

- Town
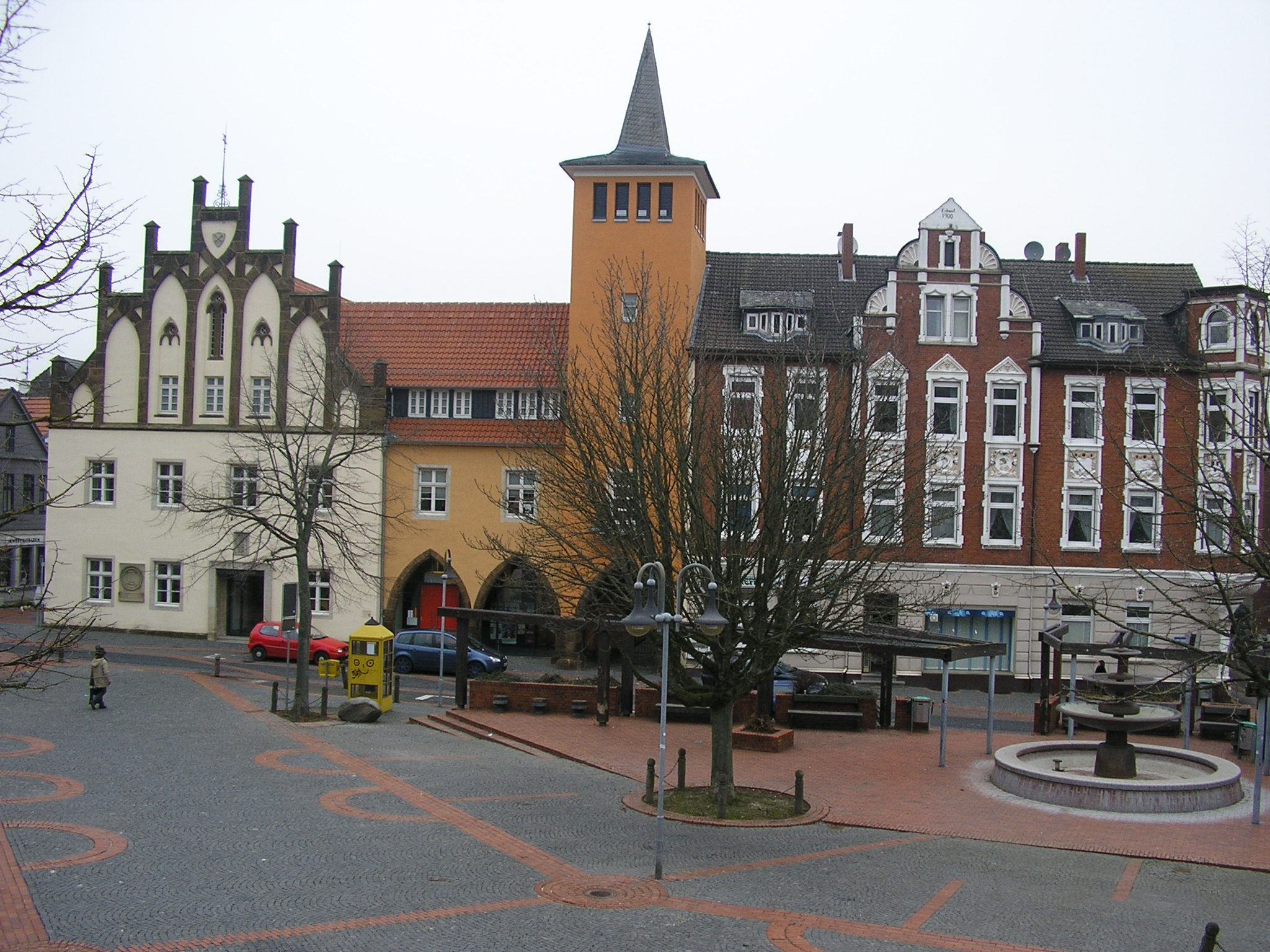

- Flag Coat of arms

- Location of Lübbecke within Minden-Lübbecke district
- Interactive map of Lübbecke
- Location within Germany Location within North Rhine-Westphalia
- Coordinates: 52°18′29″N 8°37′23″E
- Country: Germany
- State: North Rhine-Westphalia
- Admin. region: Detmold
- District: Minden-Lübbecke
- Subdivisions: 8

Government
  - Mayor (2020–25): Frank Haberbosch (SPD)

Area
  - Total: 65.04 km^{2} (25.11 sq mi)
- Elevation: 75 m (246 ft)

Population (2025-12-31)
  - Total: 26,807
  - Density: 412.2/km^{2} (1,067/sq mi)
- Time zone: UTC+01:00 (CET)
  - Summer (DST): UTC+02:00 (CEST)
- Postal codes: 32312
- Dialling codes: 05741
- Vehicle registration: MI and LK
- Website: www.luebbecke.de

Lübbecke ([ˈlʏbəkə]; Westphalian: Lübke) is a town in northeast North Rhine-Westphalia in north Germany. This former county town lies on the northern slopes of the Wiehen Hills (Wiehengebirge) and has around 26,000 inhabitants. The town is part of district of Minden-Lübbecke within the Regierungsbezirk of Detmold in the Ostwestfalen-Lippe region. Lübbecke was first mentioned in the records in 775 as hlidbeki and was given town rights in 1279.

== Geography ==
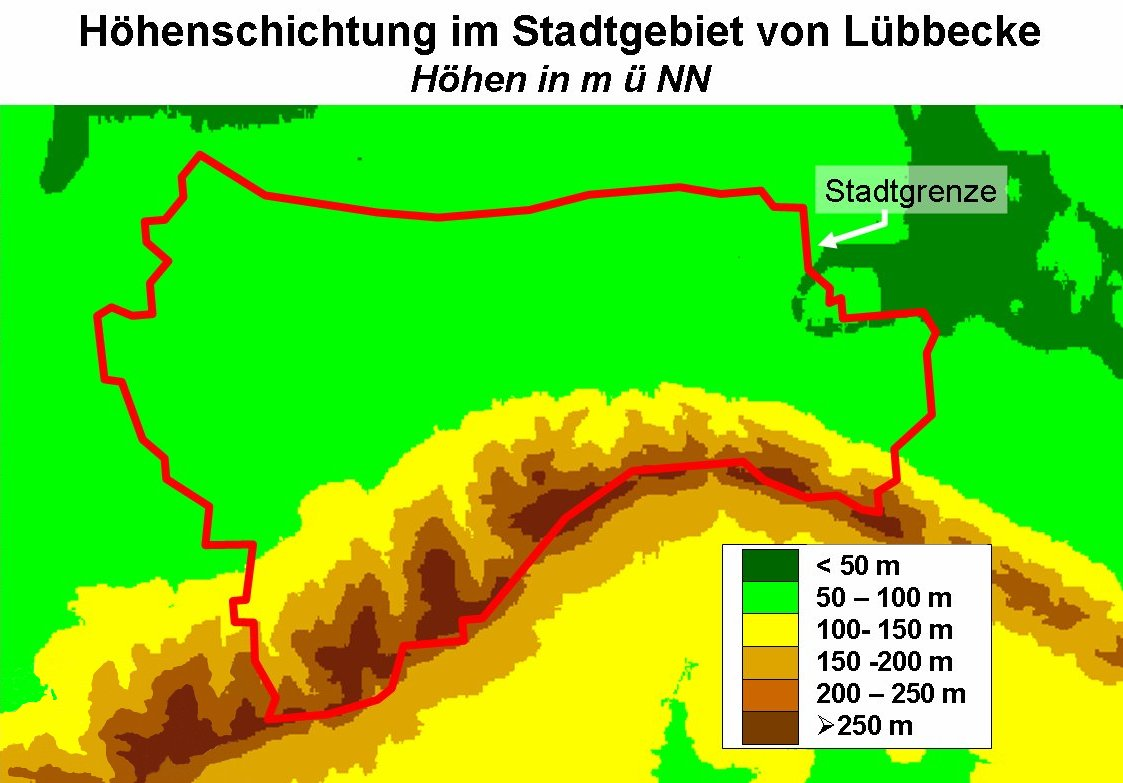
Topography of the borough

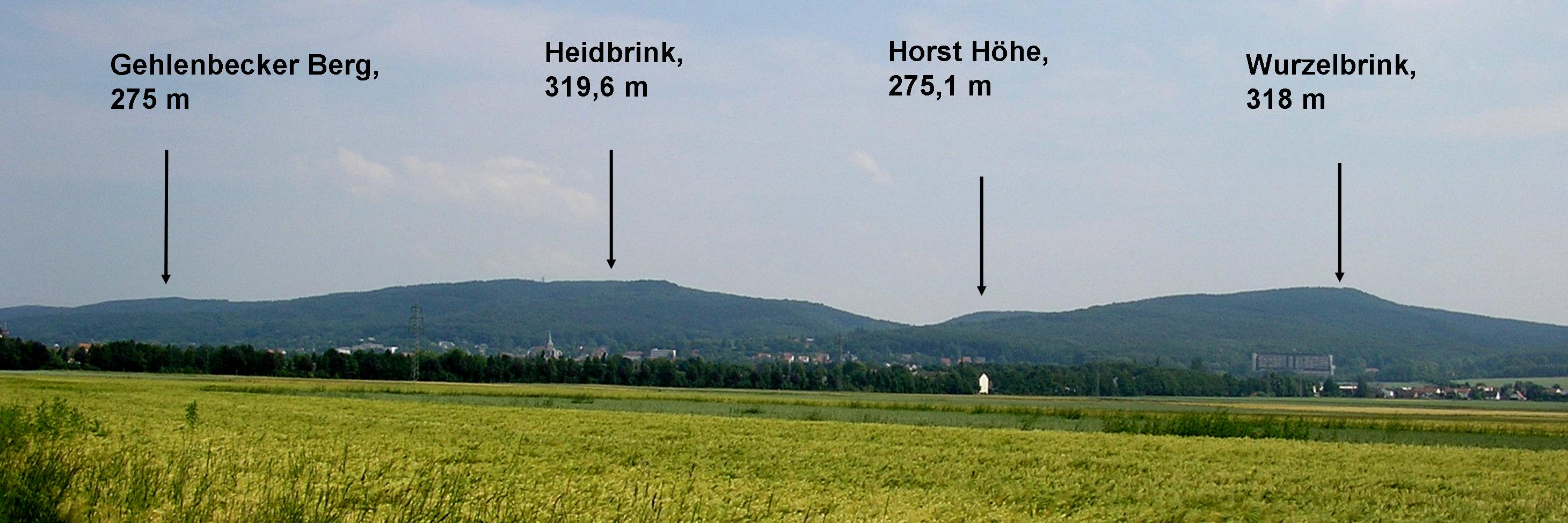
The Wiehen Hills near Lübbecke

Lübbecke is situated just north of the Wiehen Hills, approx. 20 km (12 mi) north of Herford and 20 km (12 mi) west of Minden.

=== Location ===
Lübbecke is located in northeast North Rhine-Westphalia, north of East Westphalia-Lippe (Ostwestfalen-Lippe), in the southwestern part of the district of Minden-Lübbecke. From a landscape perspective, the town lies in the west of the Minden Land. Geographically, most of the built-up area is on the North German Plain. Only its southern suburbs lie on the northern slope of the Wiehen Hills, whose crest that marks the southern boundary of the borough. The town itself lies on the edge of the hills, whils the rest of the borough is more rural in character. The northern boundary of the borough is defined by the Midland Canal (Mittelland Canal). In the northeast of the borough is the Großes Torfmoor which, together with the Oppenweher Moor, is the largest moor in Westphalia. Between the wet lowlands south of the Mittelland Canal, the glacial valley of the River Weser and the higher ground is a narrow fringe of fertile loess soils at the foot of the Wiehen Hills called the Lübbecker Lößland. The far north of the area is part of the Rahden-Diepenau Geest. In the geest there are only the villages of Stockhausen and Alswede and part of Lübbecke industrial estate.

The highest hills in Lübbecke's territory are the Heidbrink (320 m), the Wurzelbrink (319 m) and the Kniebrink (315 m). Next to the town itself is the Reineberg (276 m), the Heidkopf (273 m) and the Meesenkopf (226 m). The hills in the south of the borough are the highest in the whole of the Wiehen ridge. In the north the land only attains a height of about 50 m. The lowest point is about 48 m.

=== Waterbodies ===
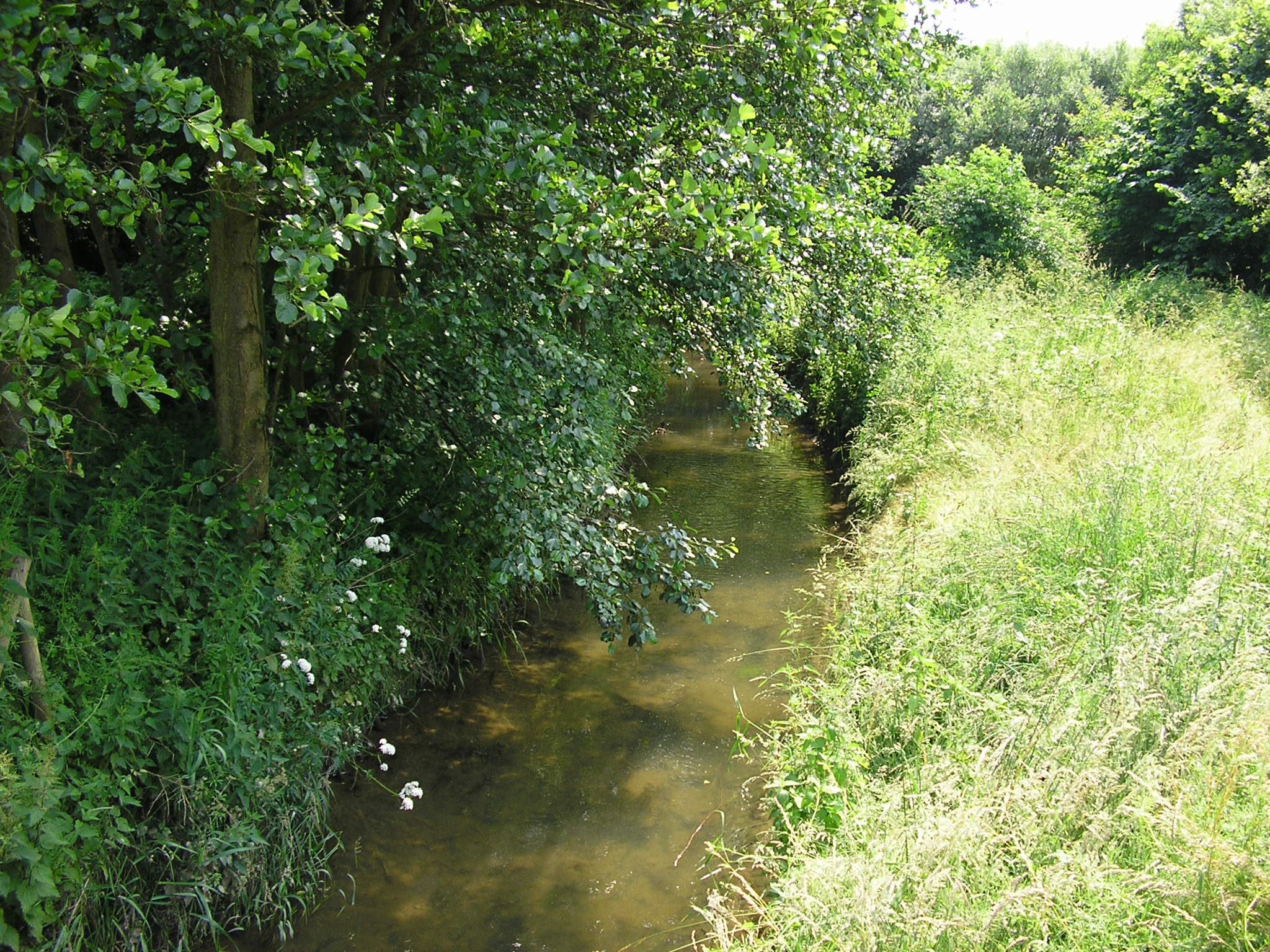
To the northwest between Hollwinkel Wood and Blasheimer Busch the borough borders on the Große Aue.

Because the watershed of the Wiehen Hills forms the southern boundary of the borough, almost the entire territory of Lübbecke is drained towards the north. Only the few hectares of land on the southern slopes of the Wurzelbrink drain towards the south. The Ronceva river flows through the town itself (mostly through pipes) and via the rivers Flöthe and Große Aue to the Weser. The Weser does not cross the borough, however, and even the Große Aue only enters it in the extreme west. The marketed "mountain spring water" (Gebirgsquellwasser) is still of great importance for the breweries in Lübbecke.

The borough of Lübbecke does not have many natural lakes. Both the river channels and the lakes and ponds in the moor are man-made. The largest bodies of water are the Mittelland Canal, with about 50 ha of water surface in Lübbecke's territory, and an unnamed lake in the moor area, which has a contiguous water area of about 9 ha. All other bodies of water have areas under 1 ha. A total of 1.5% of the borough's area (98.2 ha) is covered by water.

=== Geology and natural resources ===
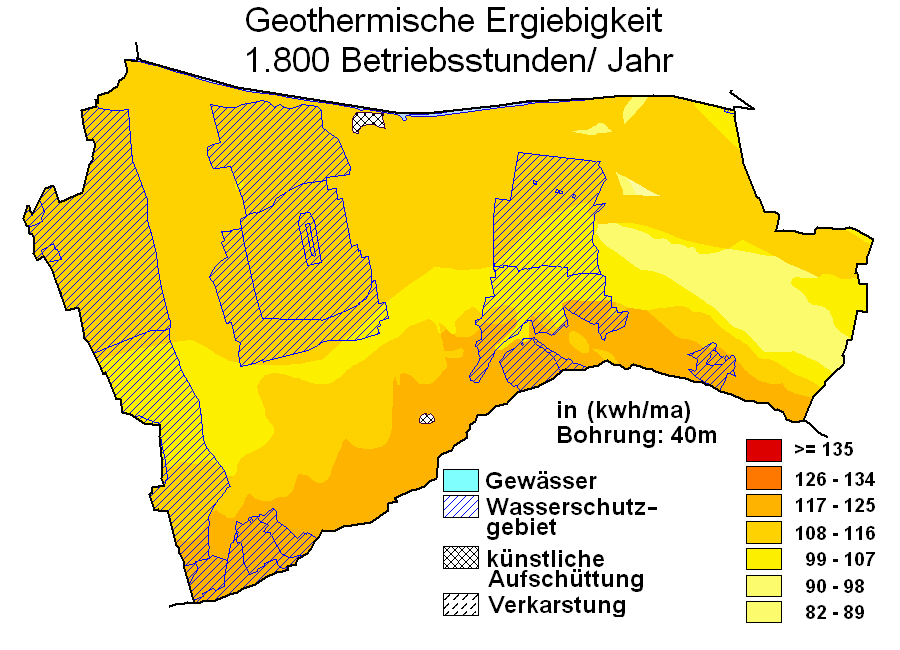
Geothermic map of Lübbecke

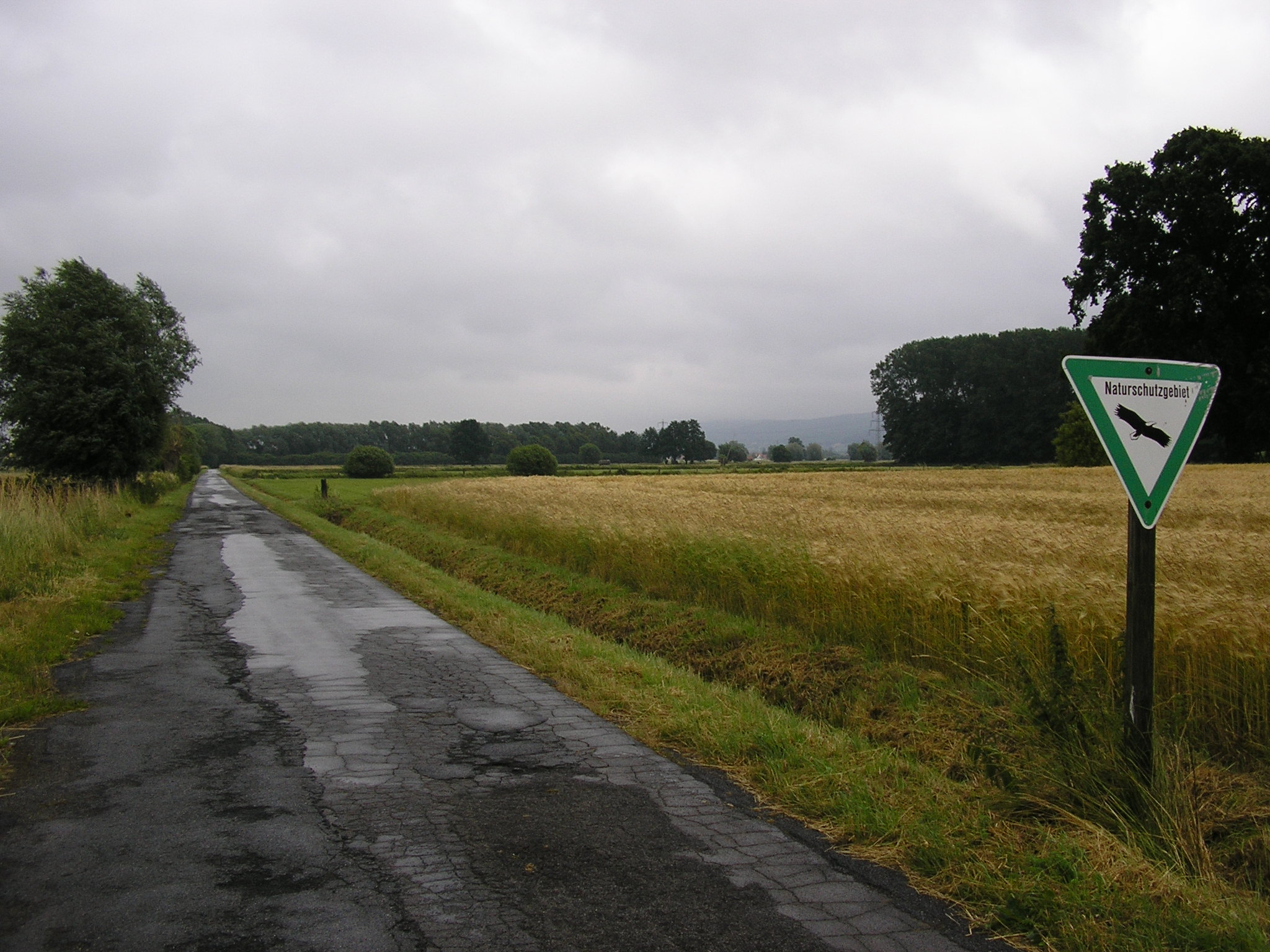
Large areas of Lübbecke borough are designated nature reserves. Above: north of Stockhausen

Geologically, the surface is mainly covered with unconsolidated rock of the Quaternary period i.e. sand, gravel, loess and glacial till, predominantly from the Pleistocene epoch. In the Wiehen Hills rocks of the Jurassic period, such as sandstone, also occur on the surface. Of particular importance, today as in the past, is the recovery of limestone for use as ballast for buildings and roads, and there is a large working quarry in the Wiehen Hills, south of Nettelstedt, where rock is broken and crushed. Numerous small quarries in the Wiehen show that there is a long mining tradition in Lübbecke. Ore appears to have been mined in the hills here for centuries; at Horst Hill there is an old mine gallery. Until the mid-20th century peat was harvested in the Großer Torfmoor, mainly for use in domestic fireplaces. Old transport systems (using tipplers) still existed until a few years ago, when production stopped due to the exhaustion of the deposits and for reasons of nature conservation.

Despite the steep natural gradients, water power cannot be used today because the small catchment area of the mountain streams only delivers small quantities of water. In the past, several water mills worked in the borough. There is a water wheel at the foot of the Wurzelbrink in the village of Eilhausen that can be visited. The use of wind power as a natural resource has recently received a boost. Windmills in places such as Eilhausen show that this energy source has been used since ancient times. The borough's location on the North German Plain favours the use of wind generators, although they are still less cost-effective than other energy generators.

Lübbecke is rated almost everywhere as good to very good in terms of its use of geothermal heat sources, especially borehole heat exchangers, and heat production using heat pumps (see the accompanying map).

=== Extent and land usage ===
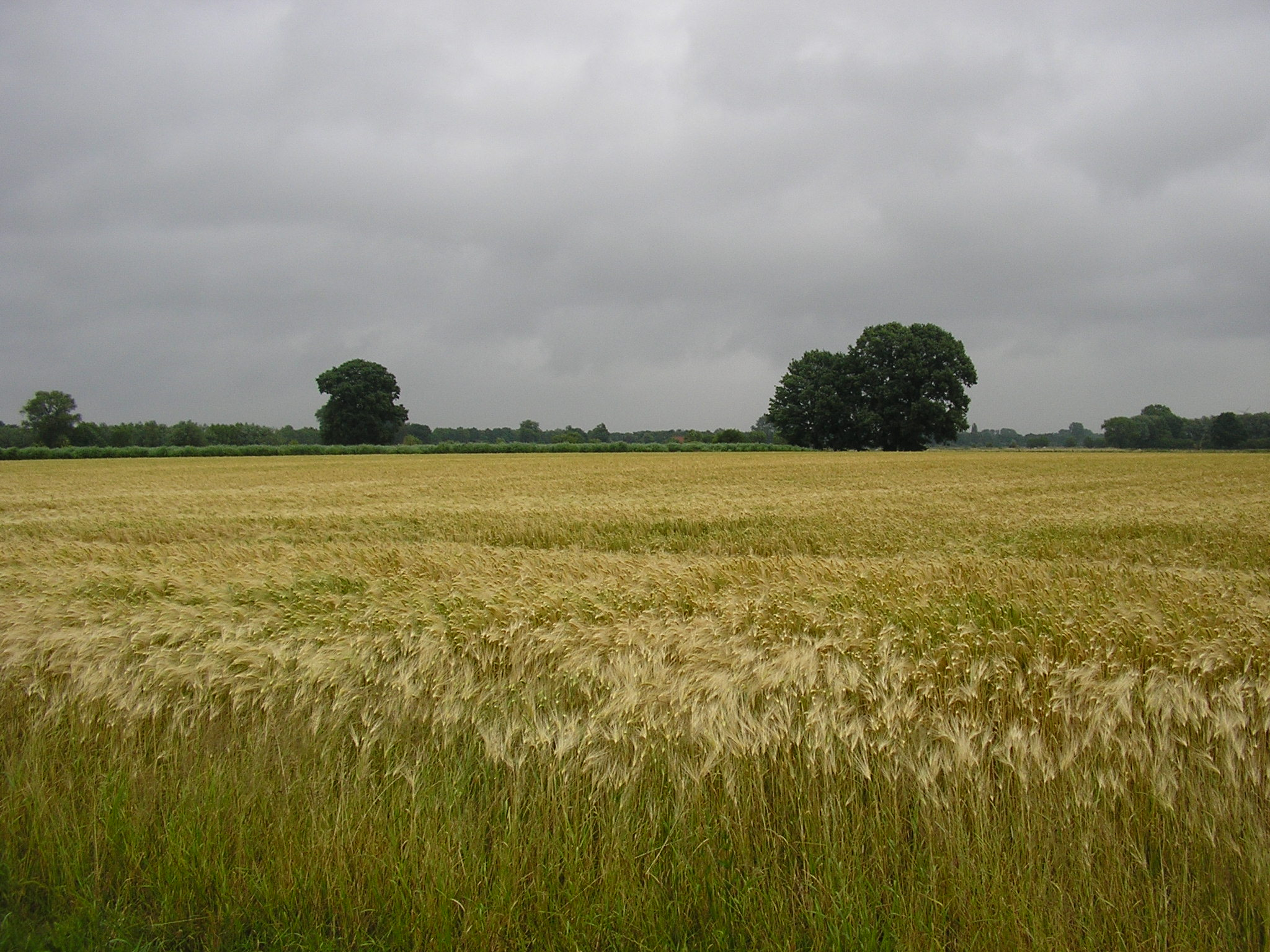
The north of the borough is sparsely settled and predominantly agricultural. Above: east of Alswede

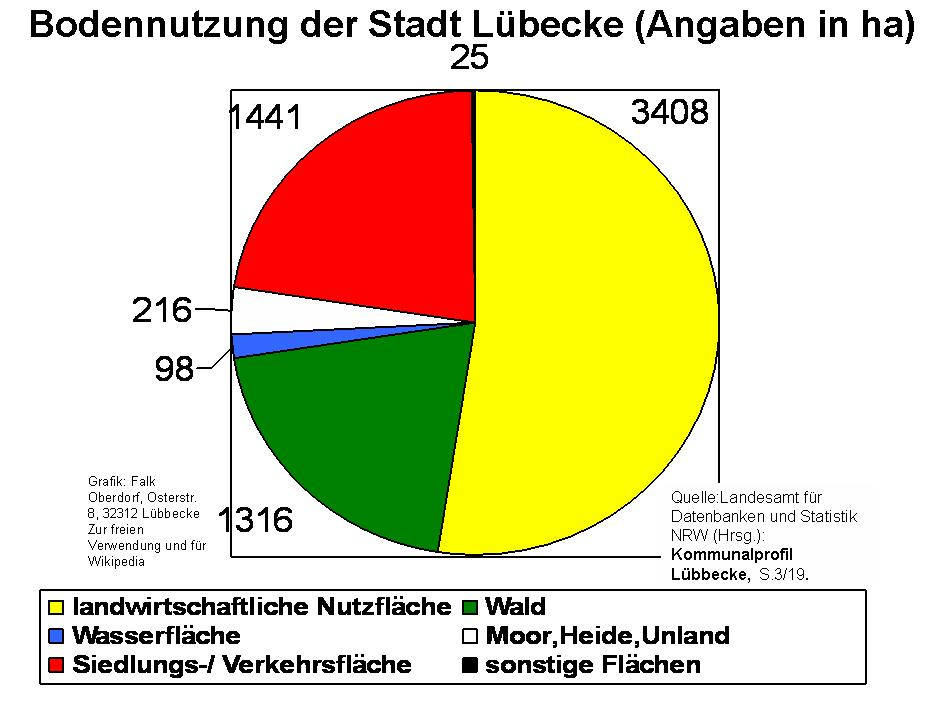
3.3% of the borough is moor, heath and wasteland, considerably higher than the average for Minden-Lübbecke district (0.7%)

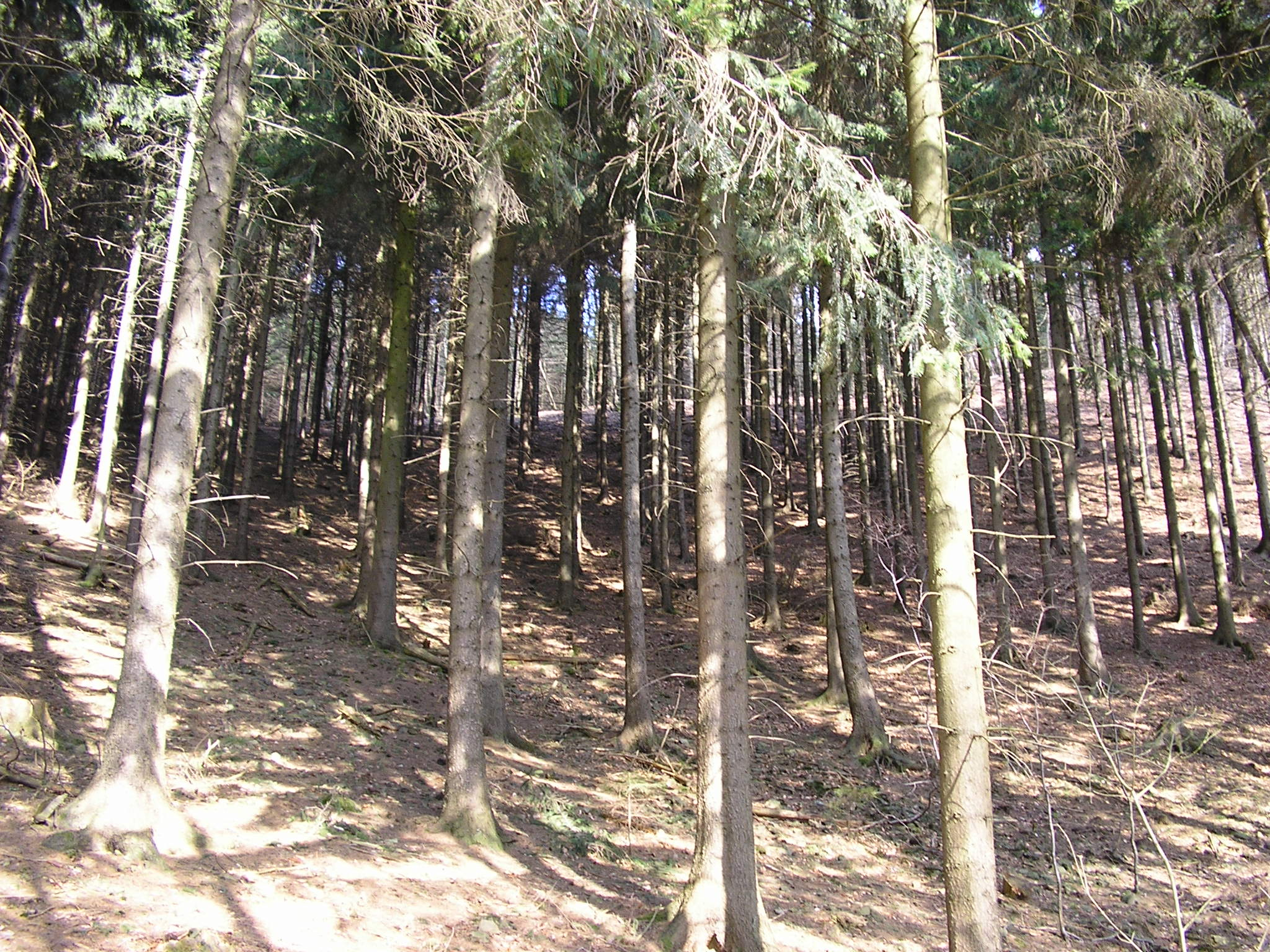
The hill forest of Lübbecke's Wiehen Hills. Above: western slopes of the Wurzelbrink

The borough has a total area of 65 square kilometres (25 sq mi), with a maximum west–east extent of 13 kilometres (8 miles) and north–south extent of around 9 kilometres (6 miles).

The borough is predominantly used for agricultural purposes and is thus very rural. In general, only the Wiehen Hills are forested. The following table gives an overview of its land usage:

Area by land use type	Agricultural terrain	Forested terrain	Settlements and transport routes	Water- bodies	Special usage
Area in ha	3,408	1,316	1,441	98	241
Proportion of total area	52.4%	22.2%	20.2%	1.5%	3.7%

Source: LDS

The most densely populated areas are the fertile foothills, known as the Lübbecke Loessland (Lübbecker Lößland); this is where almost all the villages are found. The average population density here is 600-1000 inhabitants/km^{2}. The lowlands south of the canal, apart from Lübbecke's industrial area, are very sparsely populated. The Wiehen Hills themselves are unpopulated as is the Großer Torfmoor.

The most densely populated district is the town of Lübbecke itself: with some 800 inhabitants per km^{2}, its population density is twice as high as in the whole borough. With an average of 250 inhabitants per square km, the other parts of the borough are comparatively thinly populated.

The percentage of agricultural land is lower than in the rest of the district (66%), but slightly above the national average (49.7%). The Lübbecke Loess Land is very fertile. The soil quality here is 75. As a result, this good soil, where the villages have given it space, is used mainly for agriculture. The cultivation of cereals of all kinds as well as of root crops brings in high yields. There are also scattered fruit orchards. Amongst the special crops grown here, asparagus and strawberries in the north of the borough are worth mentioning. There are only occasional pastures in the vicinity of the hill forests or in along the few meandering streams. As one travels further north, especially north-east towards the peat moors, the proportion of grassland steadily increases as the soil becomes poorer and wetter to the peat bog. East of the industrial area, meadows and pastures take up almost the entire land area. In some places the frugal green maize crop still grows albeit requiring heavy supplies of manure. Within the protected area of the peat bog, but still outside of the actual moor, there is some extensive grazing, especially of sheep, almost exclusively for environmental grounds.

The Wiehen Hills are mostly covered by forest. Much of the enclosed forest area in Lübbecke is part of the hill forests of the Wiehen Hills, which begins at around 100–135 metres (328–443 feet) and extends to cover the highest peaks. It is mainly made up of spruce forest, but large areas, particularly in the area south of the town are original beech mixed forests. Apart from the larger woods in Lübbecke Land beyond the town limits, there are only small copses in the lowlands which together comprise less than 1 square kilometre (0.4 sq mi). Inter alia These are the Stockhauser Busch, small copses in the area of the marina and the birch woods on the Großer Torfmoor. On the border of the town to the north-west at Alswede on the territory of Preußisch Oldendorf is the approximately 44 hectare Hollwinkel Wood. Part of the moor is covered with enclose birch stands. The relative proportion of forest is almost twice as high as the district average (11.2%).

The relatively high proportion of 'special' terrain is essentially that of the Großer Torfmoor. Moors, heath and wasteland cover about 3.3% of the borough.

=== Neighbouring municipalities ===
- Hüllhorst
- Espelkamp
- Preußisch Oldendorf
- Hille

=== Division of the borough ===
Borough subdivisions

According to §3 of the main by-law the territory of the borough of Lübbecke is amongst the following districts (population in brackets as at 31 December 2007):

- Lübbecke (town) (15,682 inhabitants)
- Alswede (1,068 inhabitants)
- Blasheim (1,491 inhabitants)
- Eilhausen (773 inhabitants)
- Gehlenbeck (3,279 inhabitants)
- Nettelstedt (2,725 inhabitants)
- Obermehnen (1,377 inhabitants)
- Stockhausen (779 inhabitants)

=== Climate ===
Monthly precipitation in Lübbecke

The climate in Lübbecke is dictated by its location in the maritime-continental transition region of Central Europe and on the North German Plain. The region mainly enjoys a sub-Atlantic maritime climate, but also has occasional continental influences. The winters, influenced by the Atlantic, are generally mild, the summers moderately warm, and its precipitation spread relatively evenly throughout the year. Westerly and southwesterly winds prevail, bringing precipitation with them. As a result of its location in the lee of the Wiehen Hills and Teutoburg Forest its precipitation is however lower overall than in most of the Central Upland regions of Ostwestfalen, only the tops of the hills receive rather more. The annual precipitation figures in the northern part of the borough are 680 mm (26.8 in) and on the hills about 800 mm (31.5 in).

Air temperatures average 8.9 °C (48.0 °F), the warmest month is July with 16.9 °C (62.4 °F), the coldest is January at 0.8 °C (33.4 °F). In the hills it is around 0.5 °C (0.9 °F) to 1.0 °C (1.8 °F) colder per 100 metres (328 feet) of height. For an average of 37 days (during the months of November to March) the average daytime temperatures remain below 0 °C (32 °F). The number of hours of sunshine is 1,435 hours per year, with a monthly variation from 200 hours in June to 32 hours in December.

== History ==
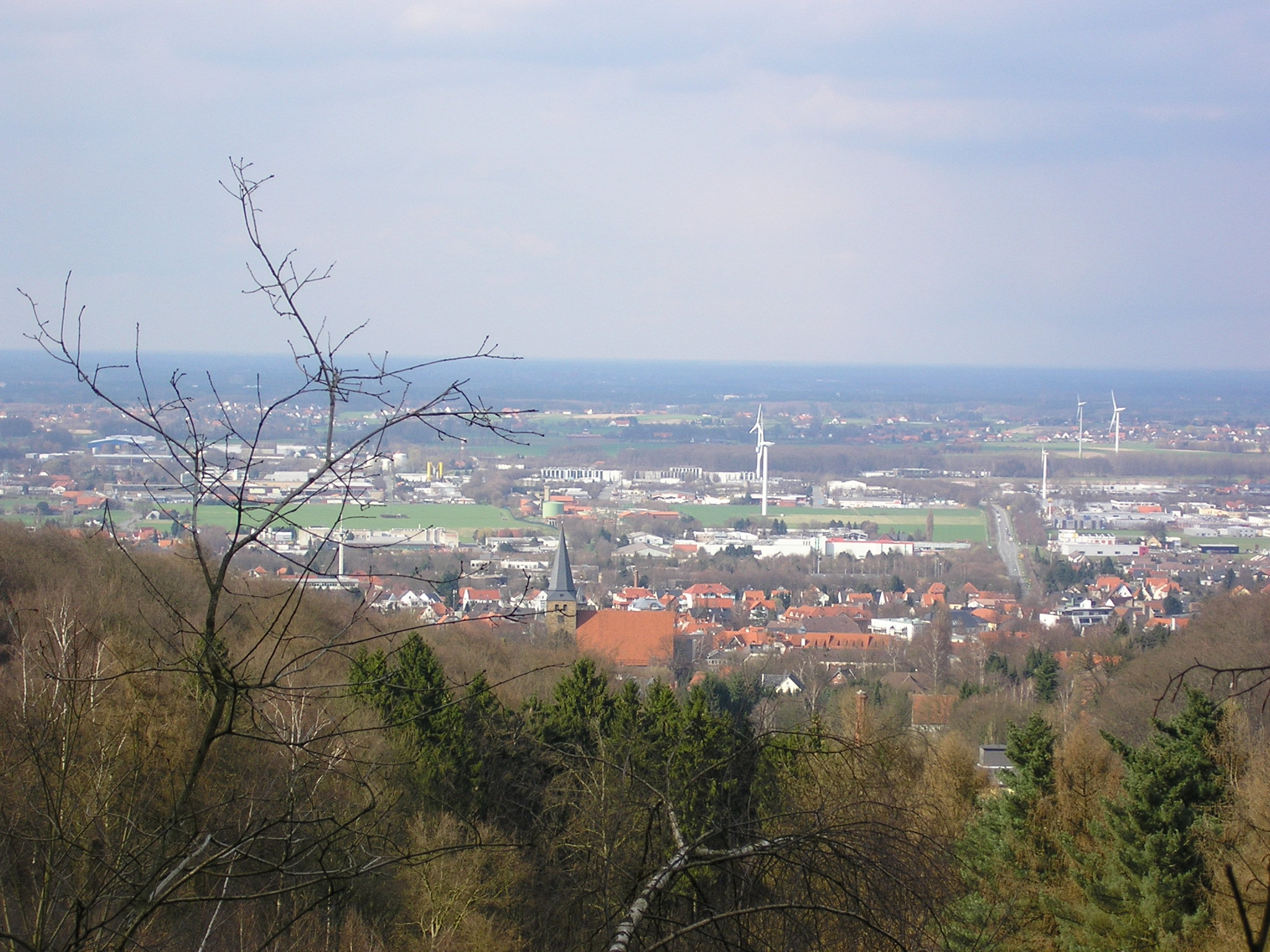
View of Lübbecke from the Wiehen Hills. In the foreground is the Old Town and St. Andrew's Church; in the background the industrial estate and North German Plain

The settlement of Lübbecke was first mentioned in 775 as hlidbeki in the Frankish imperial annals as the site of a Saxon attack on a frankish camp. The town is named after the creek today known as "Ronceva" and means little beck in English (Low German: lüt Beek or lüttke Beke, High German: kleiner Bach). Lübbecke was the central site of the Saxon hlidbeki gau. In those days there may already have been a church in hlidbeki that dated back to the Saxon Angrivarii under their duke, Widukind, a tribe who had settled the region during the spread of Christianity under Charlemagne. Lübbecke was the center of an early church parish in the Diocese of Minden, and so the nobility who were native to the area as well as the knightly family in Lübbecke were ministeriales of the bishops of Minden. By 1279 Lübbecke had been given its town charter by the Minden Bishop Volquin of Schwalenberg. The area was also run by the bishops of Minden from the country castle of Reineburg (now Hüllhorst). The lords based there came mainly from the knightly family of Lübbecke. The Burgmann estates in Lübbecke were, in turn, enfeoffed by the castle. In 1806 twelve of these Burgmann estates were recorded in the borough. The Burgmannen also held a majority on the town council, which met in town hall, first mentioned in 1460.

From 1295 Lübbecke became part of a canonical church foundation. This was founded in 1274 in Ahlden an der Aller, but moved in 1280 to Neustadt am Rübenberge and in 1295 to Lübbecke to the St. Andrew's Church. It remained here until it was abolished in 1810. The foundation had 4 estates within the town. In 1549 the diocesan synod was held here under Bishop Franz von Waldeck.

In 1648 the now secular Principality of Minden (known prior to secularization as the Bishopric of Minden), to which the present borough belonged, went to Brandenburg-Prussia. The town hall burned down in 1705 and was rebuilt in 1709. In 1765 the Prussian government arranged the division of the marks which generated a large portion of the revenue of the town through the allocation of rights and the collection of hunting revenue. Lübbecke's protests against the mark division were unsuccessful.

Lübbecke's medieval fortifications were preserved up to the beginning of the 19th century. Due to the high cost of maintenance and their limited military value, the fortifications were razed in 1830 and the material used for construction, the walls being transformed into promenades.

Until the establishment of the de facto French Kingdom of Westphalia in 1807 and the introduction of French administrative structures, the Burgmann lords remained a major centre of power in Prussian Lübbecke and hindered the development of a patrician class. The middle class merchants were however always represented on the town council by six senatorial seats and provided a civic mayor, who presided over the town jointly with a noble mayor, but the nobility held the reins. The town hall regulations adopted in 1727 by the Prussian government institutionalized this 'diarchy' and envisaged only two senatorial seats. In the Kingdom of Westphalia Lübbecke became the canton capital in the Département du Weser and in the Distrikt of Minden and remained so even when this fell to France in 1811 (from 1811, the Département de l’Ems-Supérieur). In 1813 Lübbecke became Prussian again and, after belonging briefly to the Zivilgouvernement zwischen Weser und Rhine, became part of the Prussian Province of Westphalia. After extensive administrative reforms and the dissolution of the Principality of Minden, Lübbecke became part of the newly created Regierungsbezirk Minden and district of Rahden. In 1832 Lübbecke became the administrative seat of a new district combining Rahden with elements of the district of Bünde, which was renamed into Lübbecke district.

Like almost everywhere in Minden-Ravensberg the textile industry initially emerged in proto-industrial form and, later, was supported by the Prussian state with the construction of the Cologne-Minden Railway and its branch line from Bünde to Rahden, opened in 1899. The cigar industry developed into an important economic factor in Bünde Land and the surrounding towns, including Lübbecke, from about 1860. In 1863 August Blase founded a cigar factory, which had 6,000 employees by 1938. This included employees in its many branches, because just as before in the proto-industrial textile sector, cigars were often cut, rolled and pressed in the home or in stalls. These two branches of the economy - the textile and tobacco industries - are still represented in Lübbecke today, even though their influence now lags behind that of engineering and other industries. In 1907, the last section of the Minden District Railway to Lübbecke opened (running from Minden via Hille to Eickhorst in 1903). In the 1950s, the narrow gauge railway was converted from metre gauge to standard gauge due to the transport of goods. Operations were discontinued in 1974 and the track dismantled between Hille and Lübbecke. In 1912, the first houses were connected to the electrical supply from the Lower Saxon Power Stations. In 1899 the Gasfabrik am Hahlerbaum, a local gas company, was founded; the precursor to today's public utilities. From 1934 Lübbecke had a central water supply.

In the Second World War, Lübbecke largely escaped attack and was occupied on 3 April 1945 by British troops without great resistance. The nearby town of Bad Oeynhausen became the headquarters of the British forces and British administrative authorities and military staff elements were also housed in Lübbecke. To that end 251 of the 432 houses in Lübbecke were commandeered and cordoned off as accommodation for the Allies. Almost the entire town centre became an exterritorial zone, because all the important administrative buildings of the town's infrastructure went to the British. The finance office on Kaiserstraße was used as the head office of the British Occupation Zone authorities. Even after the foundation of the Federal Republic of West Germany this building remained a base for British military staff, its last use being as the headquarters of the 2nd Armoured Division (Herford being the headquarters of the 1st Armoured Division) before it withdrew in 1983. Up on the hillside above the town was a former Hitler Youth training centre that was also commandeered after the war as Montgomery's headquarters and later became the Officers Mess for HQ 2nd Armoured Division until 1983. After the Division withdrew to the UK the building was renamed Church House and repurposed as a Christian retreat and courses centre as well as a general military conference centre until it closed in 2019 as part of the British Army's withdrawal from Germany.

The election of the first freely elected town council took place on 17 October 1948.

In 1973, after the communal reforms of the Bielefeld Act (Bielefeld-Gesetz) the districts of Minden and Lübbecke were merged into the new district of Minden-Lübbecke and the entire district administration was moved to Minden. At the same time the borough of Lübbecke was significantly increased in size by the parishes of Blasheim, Gehlenbeck, Eilhausen and Nettelstedt and the farming community (Bauernschaft) of Alswede.

=== Historical population ===
Population growth in Lübbecke from 1885 to 2007

Historical population

Year	Pop.	±% p.a.
1885	2,871	—
1900	3,636	+1.59%
1910	4,296	+1.68%
1925	4,434	+0.21%
1939	6,073	+2.27%
1950	8,549	+3.16%
1961	10,498	+1.88%
1965	20,352	+18.00%
1970	20,860	+0.49%
1975	21,098	+0.23%

Year	Pop.	±% p.a.
1980	21,468	+0.35%
1985	22,081	+0.56%
1990	23,695	+1.42%
1995	25,301	+1.32%
2000	25,908	+0.48%
2005	26,261	+0.27%
2010	25,796	−0.36%
2015	25,462	−0.26%
2020	25,573	+0.09%
2025	26,807	+0.95%

Source: Landesdatabank Nordrhein-Westfalen (1965-2025)

=== Incorporations ===
Before the municipal and land reforms that took place on 1 January 1973 the present villages formed their own parishes in Amt Gehlenbeck (Nettelstedt, Eilhausen, Gehlenbeck) or were farming communities (Bauernschaften) attached to parishes (Obermehnen, Blasheim, Stockhausen and Alswede). Obermehnen, Stockhausen as well as the eponymous farming community of Blasheim which belonged to the parish of Blasheim (Amt Preußisch Oldendorf). The community of Alswede gave its name to the parish and district (Amt) of Alswede. These incorporated areas lay almost entirely south of the Mittelland Canal, whereas the parish of Alswede, disbanded on 1 January 1973, and the districts of Amt Gehlenbeck and Amt Alswede spread out a long way to the north. For the northern boundary of the borough of Lübbeck, newly formed in 1973, the Mittelland Canal was chosen, so that the smaller areas of land north of the canal, including those that had belonged to the town of Lübbecke, were transferred to the town of Espelkamp. A bigger reorganisation was needed in the region of the former parish of Alswede. Its territory north of the canal - the villages of Fiestel and Alswede - were separated from the eponymous district of Alswede and incorporated into Espelkamp. Only the village of Alswede lying south of the canal went to Lübbecke. In the south Lübbecke was given part of the Wiehen Hills (Amt Hüllhorst) that used to belong to Ahlsen-Reineberg, namely the Reineberg and the northern slopes of the Heidbrink.

=== Religion ===
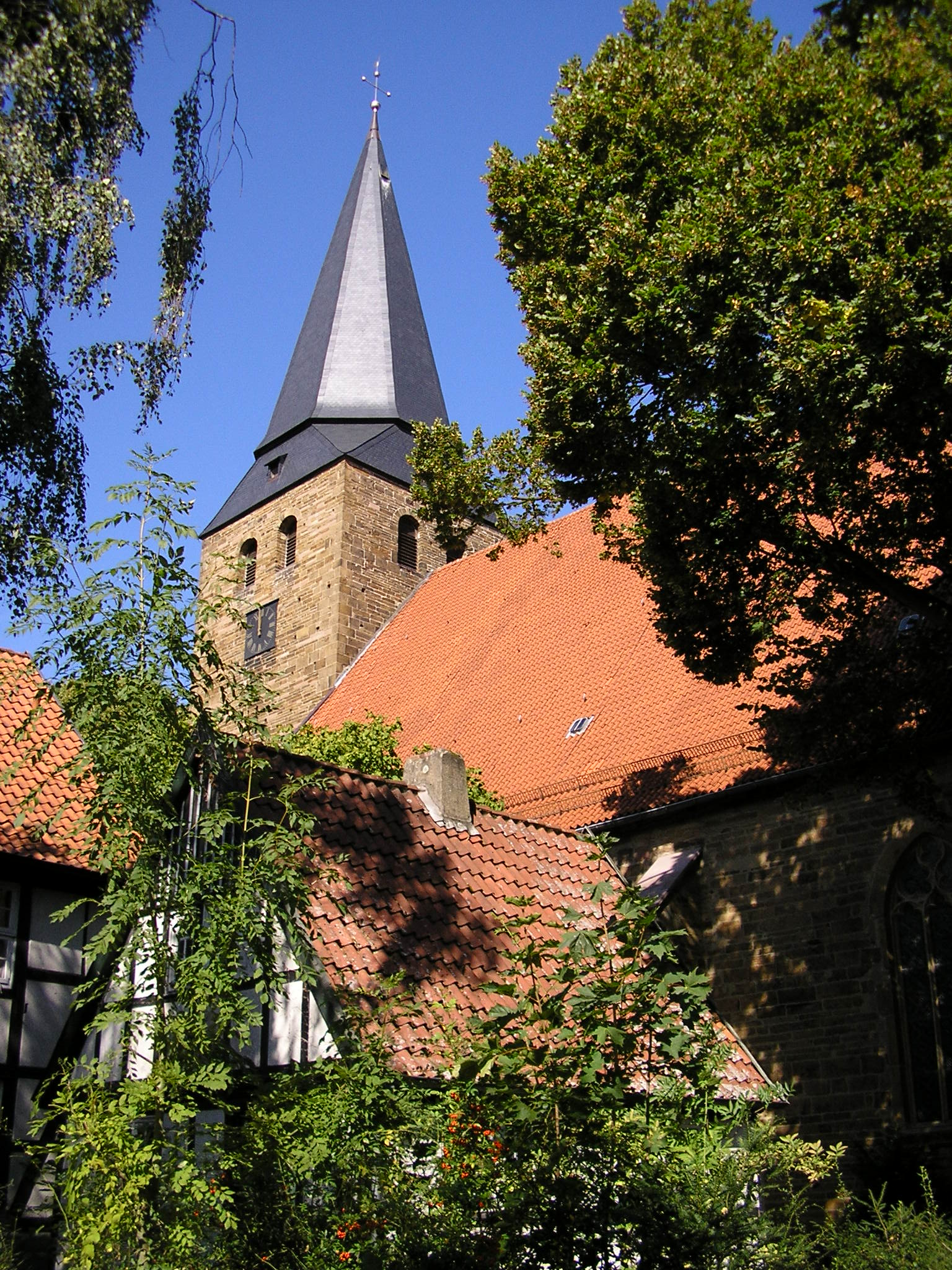
St.Andrew's, Lübbecke

The populations has been overwhelmingly Evangelical-Lutheran, since the Prince-Bishopric of Minden accepted the Protestant confession and was secularised in 1648 and, as the Principality of Minden, incorporated into Protestant Prussia. Its Protestant church parishes are the Evangelical-Lutheran parishes in Alswede, Blasheim, Gehlenbeck, Lübbecke and Nettelstedt and the Independent Evangelical-Lutheran parish of St. Peter in Stockhausen and the Evangelical-Free church parish of Lübbecke. The only Roman Catholic parish is the parish of Lübbecke. In addition there are several, other small Christian and non-Christian religious communities.

The breakdown of religious affiliation is illustrated by the example of schoolchildren in Hüllhorst. Around 72% of the children are Protestant (Evangelical), 6.8% Roman Catholic, and 4.4% Islamic. 7.4% say they belong to other religions and 9.2% don't belong to any religion.

== Culture and places of interest ==
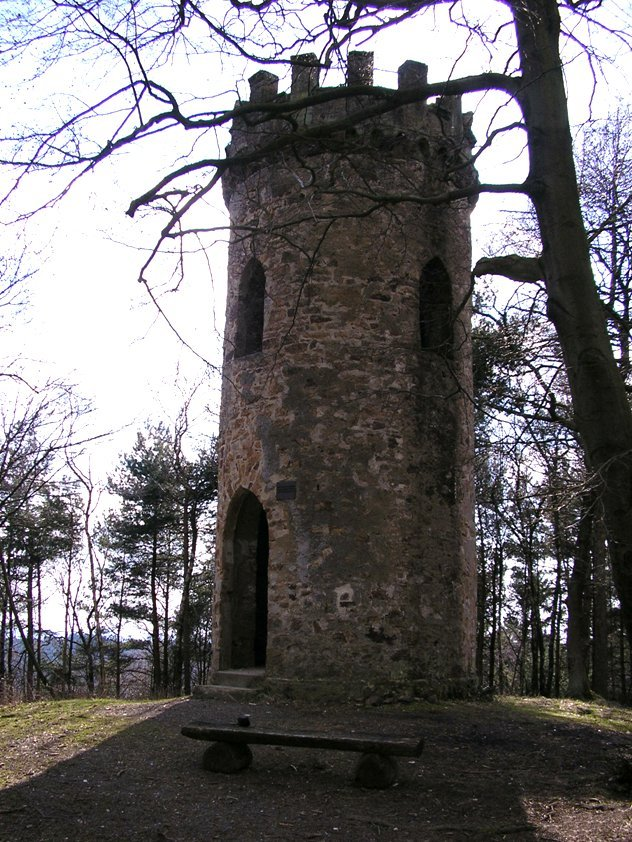
The watchtower on the Wurzelbrink

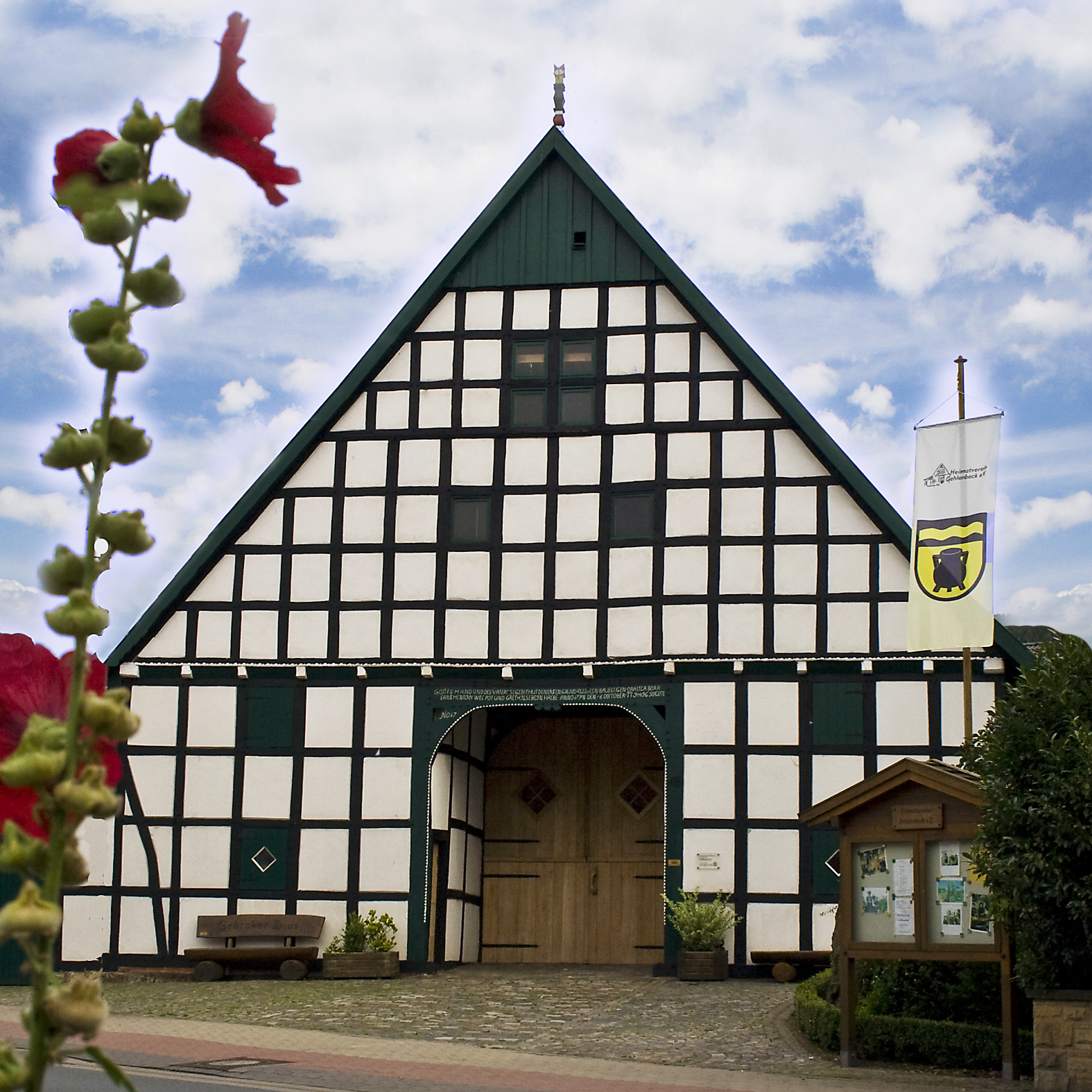
Gehrmker Hius Gehlenbeck

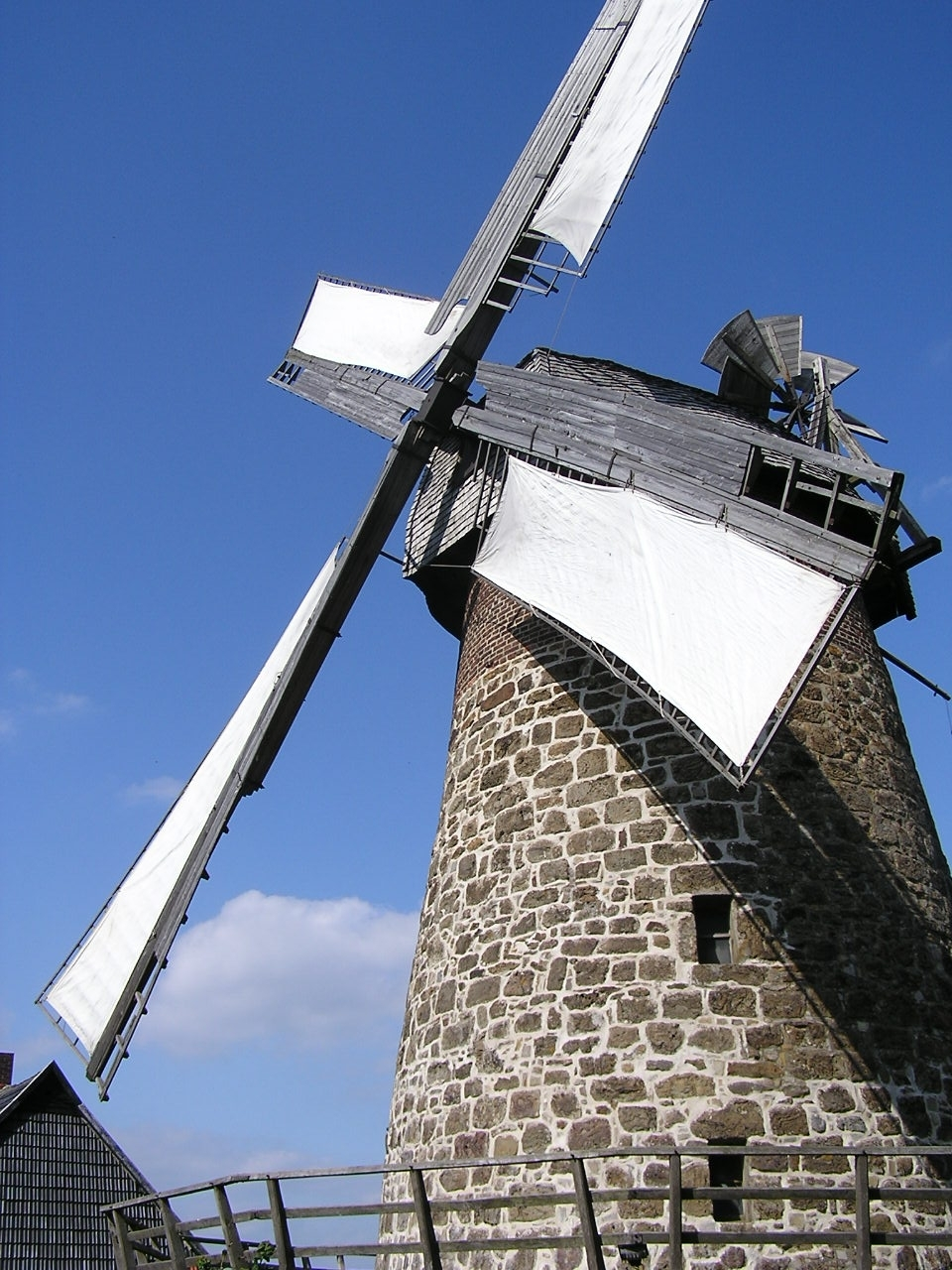
Königsmühle Eilhausen

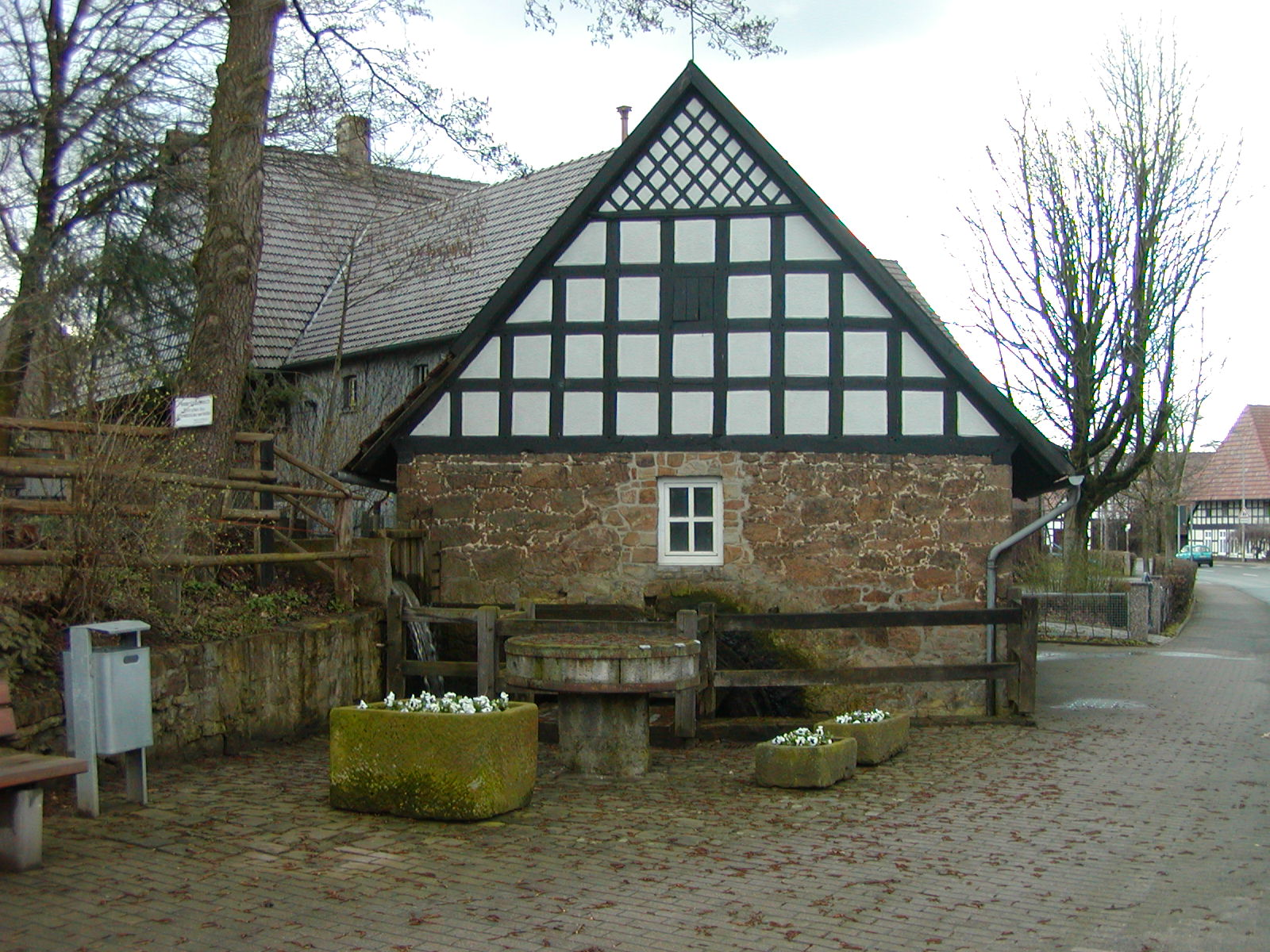
Eilhausen watermill

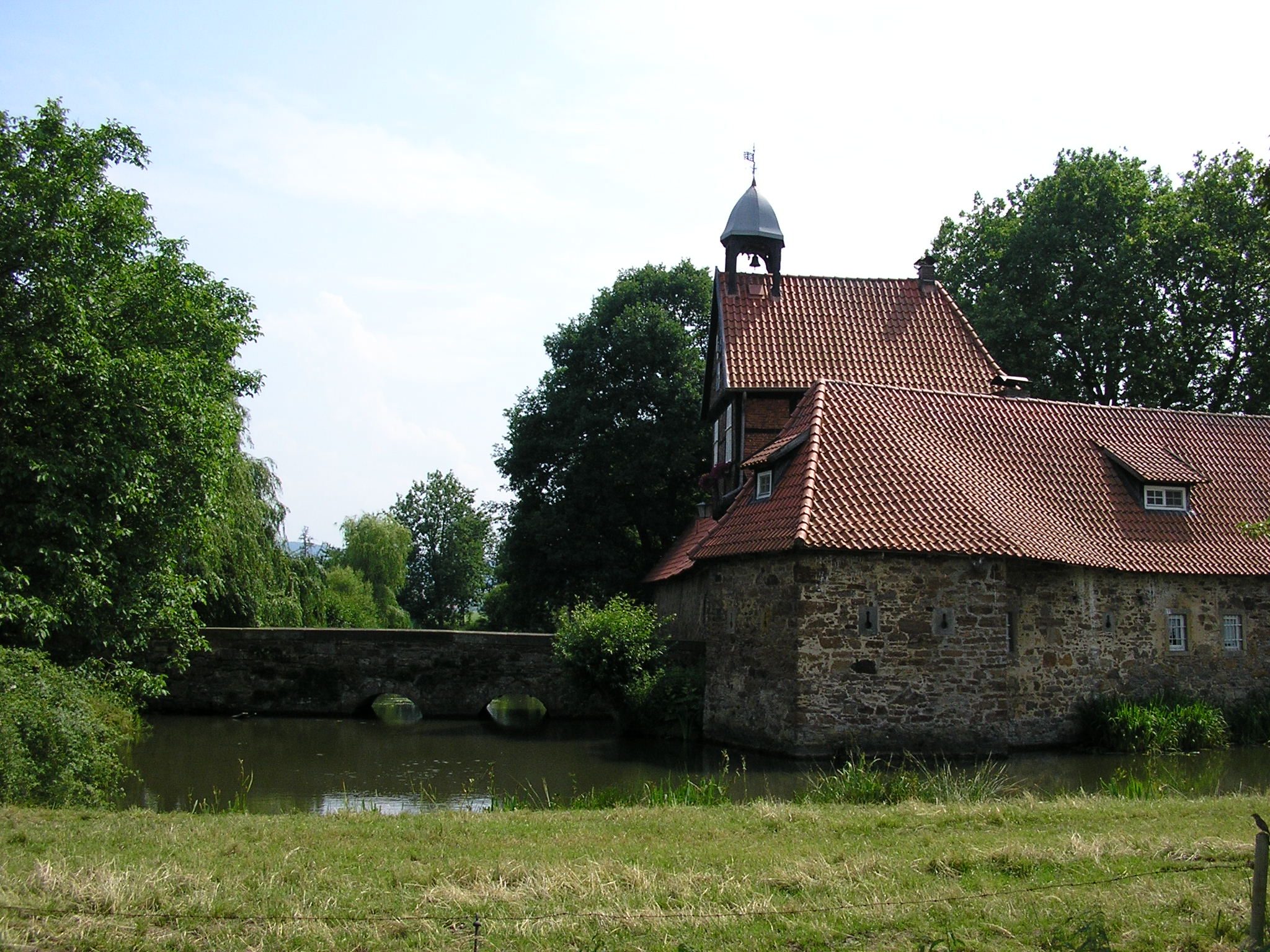
Stockhausen Manor House

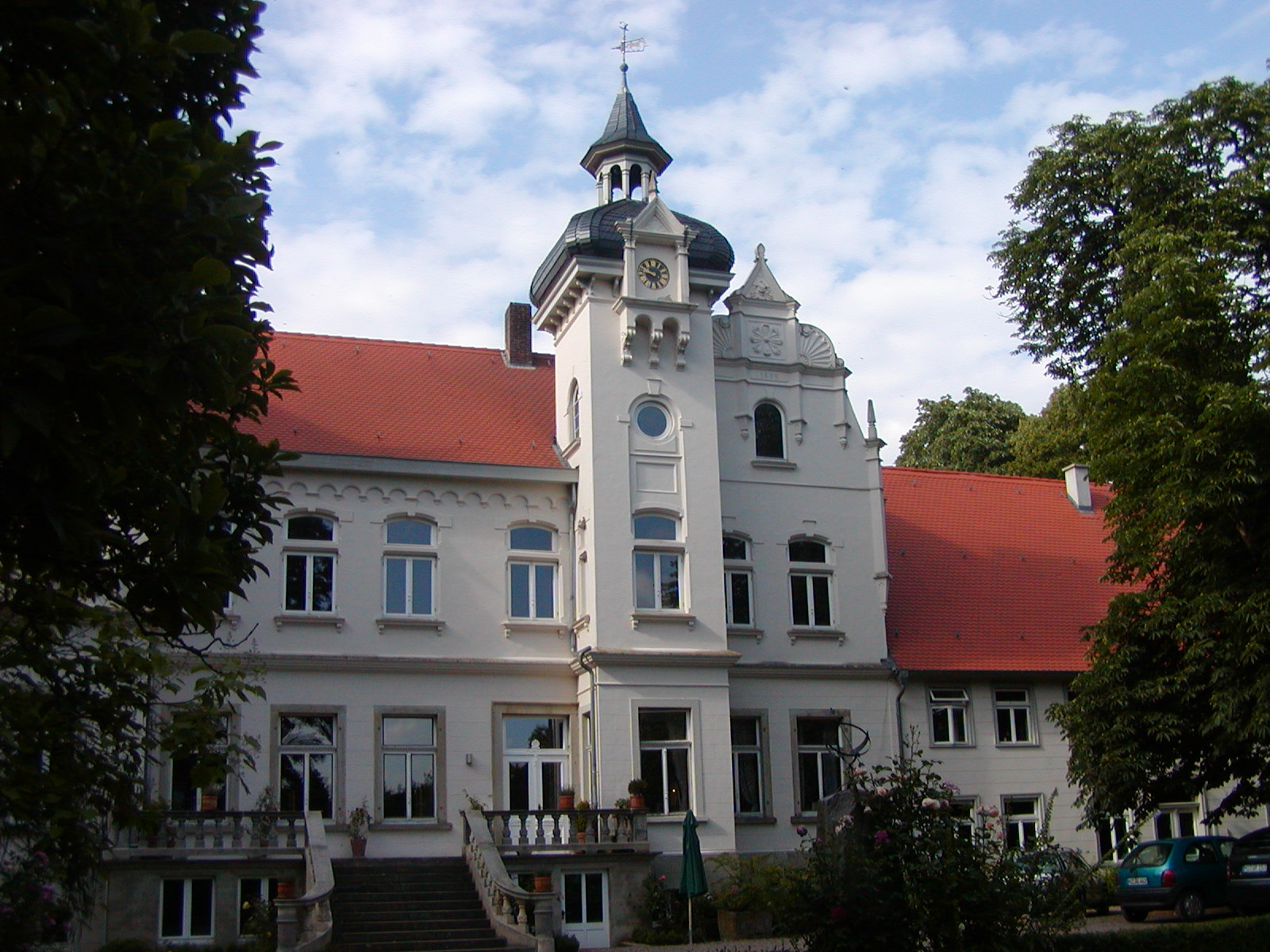
Renkhausen Manor House

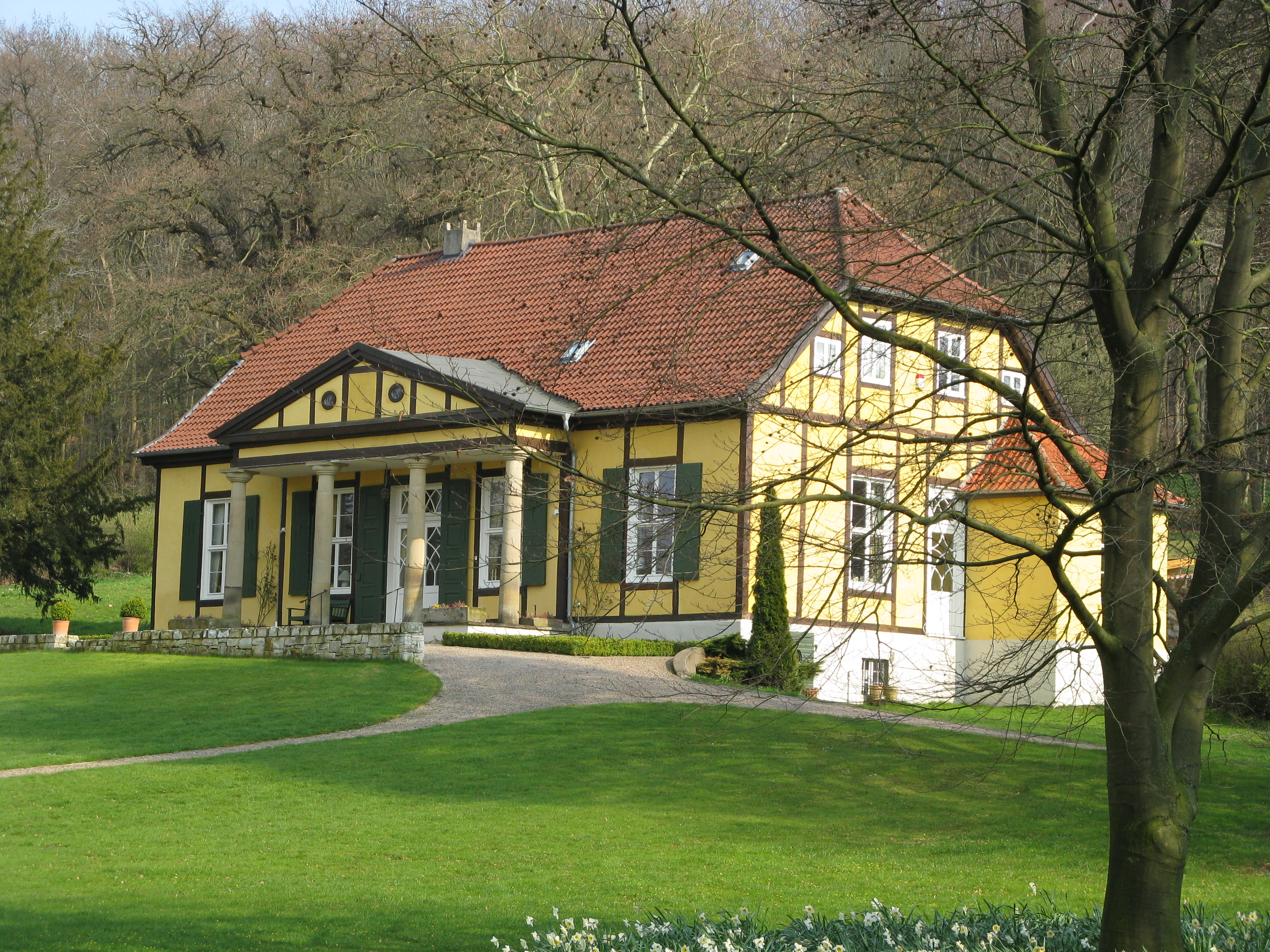
Ministerhaus Obernfelde Manor House

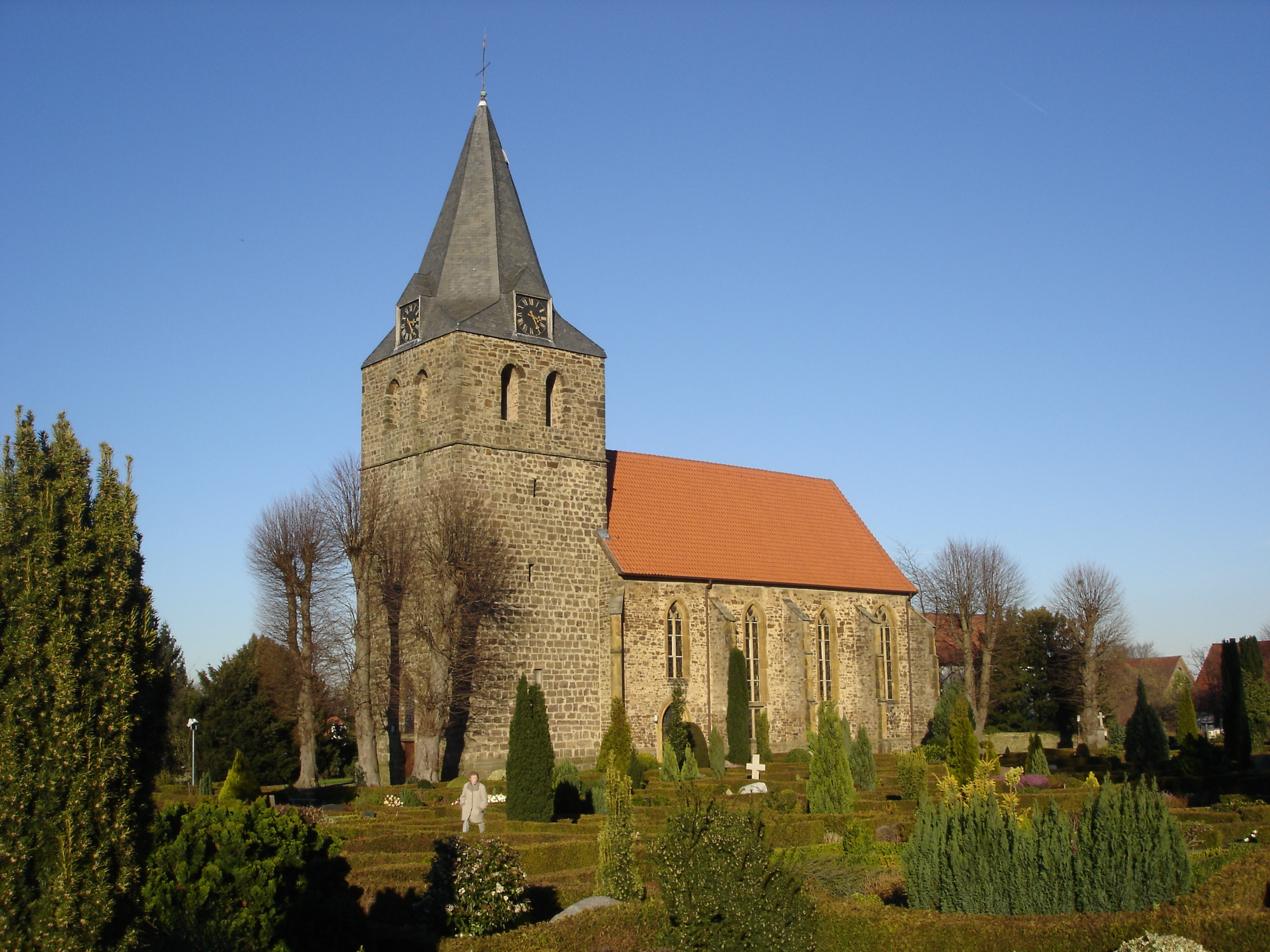
The Gehlenbeck Church

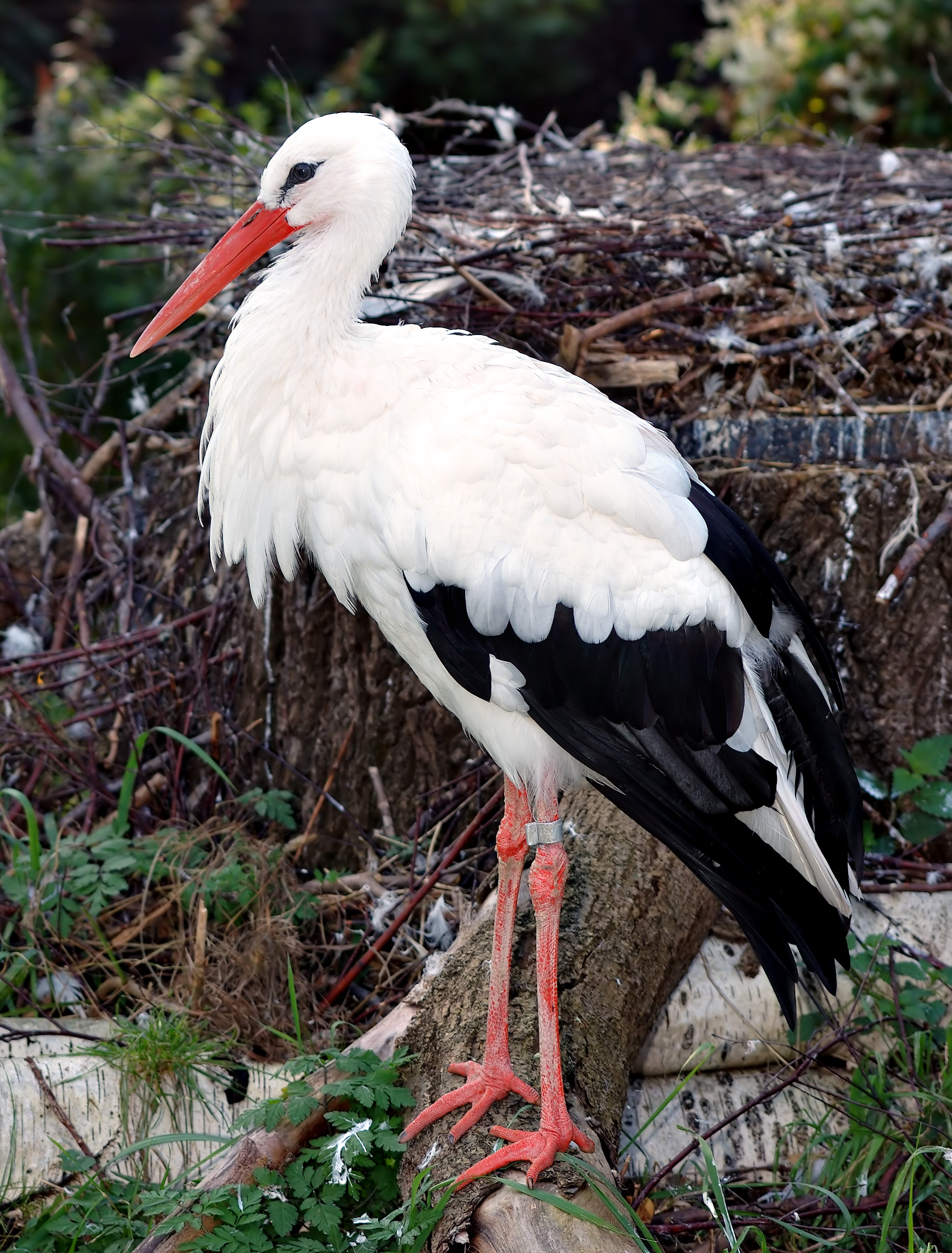
The white stork breeds in Lübbecke

=== Theatre ===
The Nettelstedt Open Air Stage (Freilichtbühne Nettelstedt) founded in 1923 is an amateur theatre stage with around 900 seats. The Kahle Wart Open Air Stage (Freilichtbühne Kahle Wart) lies right next to the town boundary, albeit on Hüllhorst territory. In the town hall, that has an audience capacity of about 650, there are regular performances and concerts by visiting ensembles.

=== Music ===
The numerous trombone bands, such as the Posaunenchor Nettelstedt, grew out of the pietistic trombone bands of the late 19th century and still exist today. In Lübbecke there is a music school and the Jazzclub Lübbecke. St. Andrew's Church has an eponymous choir. In Gehlenbeck a people's choir (Volkschor) was founded in 1922. The idea came from the workers of the numerous cigar factories of that time, who often sang songs at work and wanted to form a society around their pastime.

The Lübbecke Symphony Orchestra (Sinfonieorchester Lübbecke) was founded in 1950 and celebrated its 60th anniversary during the 2009–2010 concert season. Some of its soloists come from the teaching staff of the Pro Musica music school in Lübbecke.

=== Museums ===
- Barre's Beer World Brewery Museum (Brauereimuseum Barre's Brauwelt): the museum of the town's local brewery, is housed in an old storage cellar and covers the history of the brewery as well as brewing in general.
- Lübbecke Town Museum (Museum der Stadt Lübbecke): A comprehensive collection of traditional costume, a cigar-making collection, a cobbler's workshop and many other exhibits of town history are displayed in the town museum on the market square. The exhibits include coins, weapons, paintings and silver jewellery from the 16th to the 19th centuries. The oldest finds date to the Bronze Age.
- The Gehrmker Hius in Gehlenbeck offers an insight into the village life of bygone years.

=== Buildings in Lübbecke ===
- St. Andrew's Church. The church was built from 1160 to 1180 in the Romantic style and converted into a Gothic hall church in 1350.
- The ruins of Reineberg Castle are located on the Reineberg, the local hill of Lübbecke. The site was first mentioned in 1221 in the records and was largely demolished in 1723. Today only the remains of the ramparts and moat are recognisable.
- The Old Town Hall is a cultural and media centre. The building is first recorded in 1460, but was largely rebuilt after a town fire in 1709. It is a two-storey, rendered, solid building with a gable roof. In the rebuilding work carried out in 1861, it was fitted with a neo-Gothic stepped gable. The east wing with its adjoining Fire Service Tower, whose pointed arch, ground floor arcades reflect the shape of the gable, were not added until 1936. In 2006–2007, the building was turned into a cultural and media centre and extended to the rear.
- Residential buildings. Although Lübbecke was largely spared from destruction during the Second World War, its old town no longer has a coherent appearance. Until the middle of the 20th century, its streets comprised rows of ordinary, gabled, timber-framed buildings, the majority of which dated to the 18th and 19th centuries. Several of them had bay windows. Not until the redevelopment of the town carried out at the end of the 1960s were there significant losses in the stock of historic houses. The market place (Marktplatz), which was a victim of redevelopment to make way for residential houses and businesses like the Tribbenhof, was particularly badly affected. In 1975, one of the most attractive timber-framed houses in the town, No. 6 Blüttenstraße, with its double-jettied gable, was demolished. Amongst the surviving stone buildings, the house of the industrialist Hecht family, No. 7 Ostertorstrasse, stands out. This classicist plastered building with its central avant-corps was built in 1832 as a restaurant and hotel. Its outside staircase, removed in the 1950s was reconstructed in the 1990s. On Niedertorstraße lies the so-called Old Apothecary (Alte Apotheke). This two-storey, half-timbered building with its mansard roof was built in 1820. Other timber-framed buildings have survived on Langen Straße (Nos. 23, 25, 26 and 44) and in the vicinity of St. Andrew's Church, including the dean's residence, No. 3, Pfarrstraße. On Wilhelmsplatz 1 lies the raised, single-storey Pfarrwitwenhaus ("priest's widow's house"), whose history goes back to the 18th century. It was comprehensively restored in 2002 and is now a bed and breakfast inn.
- The Burgmannshof von der Recke, on Am Markt 19 is a local history museum. The date over the main entrance of this two-storey, rendered solid building with its outside staircase is 1735, but its core is probably older. As well as the manor house (Herrenhaus) a part of the courtyard wall, the gate and the storage barn (Speicher), restored in 1985, have survived.
- Grapendorfs Hof (community centre), Gerichtsstraße 5. Of the former manor that comprised several buildings, only the manor house itself has survived. The core of the house is likely to date to the end of the 16th century. Damaged in the town fire of 1734, the manor was subsequently rebuilt. Today it forms a modest, heptagonal plastered building with a mansard roof, whose outside staircase was removed in recent times for the benefit of traffic. In 1828 the former castellan's residence (Burgmannshof) was bought from the treasury office, in order to use it as the town court. In 1845 and 1846 it was expanded by a wing to the north, also heptagonal in shape, that acted as a district prison. In 1988, after the district court moved to a larger building, the complex was returned to the town which turned it into a citizens’ community centre. This was opened in 1993. The old district court is used nowadays by numerous groups.
- Barre Brewery (Brauerei Barre). The oldest buildings were built shortly after the foundation of the brewery in 1842. The site is dominated by the mash house with its Gothic tower.
- On the second highest hill in the borough, the Wurzelbrink (319 m above NN), is a watchtower built in the 19th century, known as the Wartturm.
- Beer Fountain (Bierbrunnen): The fountain on the Burgmannshof, donated in 1954 by Ernst-Ludwig Barre, dispenses beer once a year during the Beer Fountain Festival (Bierbrunnenfest).

=== Buildings in the borough ===
- St. Nicholas' Church in Gehlenbeck was built around 1495. The tower of the Gehlenbeck church is considerably older and was probably erected in the period 1100–1150. There must have been an earlier church by the 10th century, as was indicated by excavations. A church here is first recorded in 1156.
- St. Andrew's Church, Alswede: probably built from the destroyed castle of Mesenburg above Lübbecke.
- Gehrmker Hius: the Gehrmker Hius in its present style is a timber-framed farmhouse from the year 1798. It is used today as a local history house (Heimathaus).
- Königsmühle Eilhausen: this smock mill in Eilhausen was built in 1748 and has a round, sandstone mill tower. The mill has a fantail. The mill is a waypoint on the Westphalian Mill Route.
- Wassermühle Eilhausen: the rubble stone building with timber-framed gables may have been built in 1698. The overshot water wheel has a diameter of 2.6 metres. In the 19th century there were many such mills in Lübbecke. The mill is a waypoint on the Westphalian Mill Route.
- Stockhausen Manor House: The manor house is a water castle in Stockhausen. The origins of this manor house go back to at least the 14th century.
- Stockhausen: Stockhausen is characterised by its rustic farmsteads with their timber framing typical of the regional and their associated hireling cottages. It has 19 listed buildings. Farmyard oaks, mixed orchard meadows and cottage gardens reinforce the countryside feeling. In the competition "Our Village Should Become More Beautiful" (Unser Dorf soll schöner werden) Stockhausen was awarded gold several times in 1995. In 1997 Stockhausen was designated one of four "model cultural villages" (Kulturmusterdörfern) in Ostwestfalen-Lippe.
- Renkhausen Manor House: the neo-Renaissance style manor house was founded on the walls of an old water castle that was first mentioned in 1278.
- Obernfelde Manor House: the former knight's estate and manor house was first mentioned in 1540.
- Eickel Manor House: formerly called Echolte Manor House, it is located near Blasheim. A reference to a knight called Eylwast of Echolte suggests that the manor house may well have existed before 1183. Formerly there was a Groß-Eickel Manor House and a Klein-Eickel Manor House. These two estates were however merged at the start of the 18th century.
- Babilonie: the La Tène culture hillfort lies on a hill in the Wiehen near Obermehnen and could have been a refuge castle.
- Meesenburg: only the ruins of this fortification on the Meesenkopf hill have survived. It was probably slighted in the 12th century.

=== Parks ===
Due to its small size and proximity to moorland and forest, Lübbecke has no need for expansive parks in the traditional sense. Within walking distance from the city are the Wiehen Hills and TERRA.vita Nature Park. Near the town center there is Gallenkamp, a park-like, elevated open space, which offers a view over the Lübbecker Land. In winter the Gallenkamp is used by Lübbecke's youth for tobogganing. There is also a long strip of parkland in the area of Schützenstraße. Another large, local area of grassland with paths is located between the cemetery and the Wittekind Grammar School (Wittekind-Gymnasium). Significantly, all the aforementioned parks and open spaces are within range of the more select residential areas, which are in the immediate vicinity of the Wiehen Hills.

Outside the town itself the majority of parks are in the grounds of manor houses and castles. These include the following parks none of which are open to the public:

- Stockhausen Manor Park: Little remains of the former Baroque gardens. An avenue of chestnuts, around 200 years old, runs from north to south from the manor house to the Recke family graveyard and was once an element of the gardens.
- Renkhausen Manor Park: The landscape gardens of the manor house were laid out around 1900. A central element is the open area of lawn, which is studded with old trees. An artificial hill and a grotto also form part of the gardens. A 100-year-old Renkhausen lime avenue runs eastwards from the manor house.
- Obernfelde Manor Park: The manor park was probably laid out together with the orangery, built in 1829 and now a residence. The orangery forms the centrepiece of a historic landscape park with a relatively extensive system of paths and avenues. Of the original park only a few elements south of the orangery remain.

=== Nature ===
That part of the Wiehen Hills in the borough of Lübbecke is also part of the TERRA.vita Nature Park (formerly the North Teutoburg Forest-Wiehen Hills Nature Park). There are also six nature reserves in the borough:

- Bastauwiesen: 1,844 ha of protected wet meadows along the Bastau. Large parts of the area lie in Hille and the borough of Minden.
- Finkenburg: 13 ha area in Blasheim.
- Gehlenbecker Masch: 45 ha of wet meadows
- Großes Torfmoor: Westphalia's biggest raised bog (Hochmoor). The 467 ha nature reserve lies partly in Hille.
- Rauhe Horst – Schäferwiesen: 198 ha of water meadows and wet grassland.
- Sonnenwinkel: 4.3 ha of deciduous forest

The ratio of designated nature reserve land in Lübbecke is over 10 per cent and thus significantly greater than that in the state (7.3 per cent) and the Federation (2 per cent). This high value is all the more surprising because the near-natural Wiehen Hills, apart from the Sonnenwinkel are not a formally designated nature reserve.

The wildlife in Lübbecke includes the following large animals in the near-natural forested and moorland areas: wild boar and roe deer, fox, badger especially in the Wiehen, but also on cultivated land. In the moorland areas there are white stork, and the poisonous viper. Lübbecke is one of only two places, the other being nearby Petershagen, in the state of North Rhine-Westphalia where wild white storks still breed. In the area south of the town is the largest colony of bats; often seen over the gardens on summer evenings.

Five groups of trees or isolated trees near Lübbecke and in the village of Gehlenbeck have been designated as natural monuments.

There are serious discussions that Lübbecke, possibly in cooperation with the neighbouring town of Espelkamp, will apply to stage the state garden show in 2017.

== Twin towns – sister cities ==
Lübbecke is twinned with:

- Bayeux, France (1968)
- Dorchester, United Kingdom (1973)
- Tiszakécske, Hungary (1989)
- Bad Liebenwerda, Germany (1990)

== Sport ==
The team handball club TuS Nettelstedt-Lübbecke is at home in Lübbecke. The club currently competes in the German First League of Handball.

== Education ==
=== Schools ===
- Wittekind Gymnasium Lübbecke
- Stadtschule Lübbecke
- Pestalozzi School
- Berufskolleg Lübbecke
