= Alswede =

- Ortsteil of Lübbecke
- Location of Alswede within Lübbecke
- Interactive map of Alswede
- Location within Germany Location within North Rhine-Westphalia
- Coordinates: 52°20′N 8°34′E
- Country: Germany
- State: North Rhine-Westphalia
- District: Minden-Lübbecke
- Town: Lübbecke

Area
  - Total: 2.80 km^{2} (1.08 sq mi)
- Elevation: 37–40 m (121–131 ft)

Population (2020)
  - Total: 1,012
  - Density: 361/km^{2} (936/sq mi)
- Time zone: UTC+01:00 (CET)
  - Summer (DST): UTC+02:00 (CEST)
- Postal codes: 32312
- Dialling codes: 05743

Alswede is a village in the East Westphalian borough of Lübbecke in Minden-Lübbecke district in the German state of North Rhine-Westphalia.

== Politics ==
- The parish chair of Alswede is Günther Vullriede.
- The local historian is Helmut Woelk.

(as at July 2008)

== Gallery ==
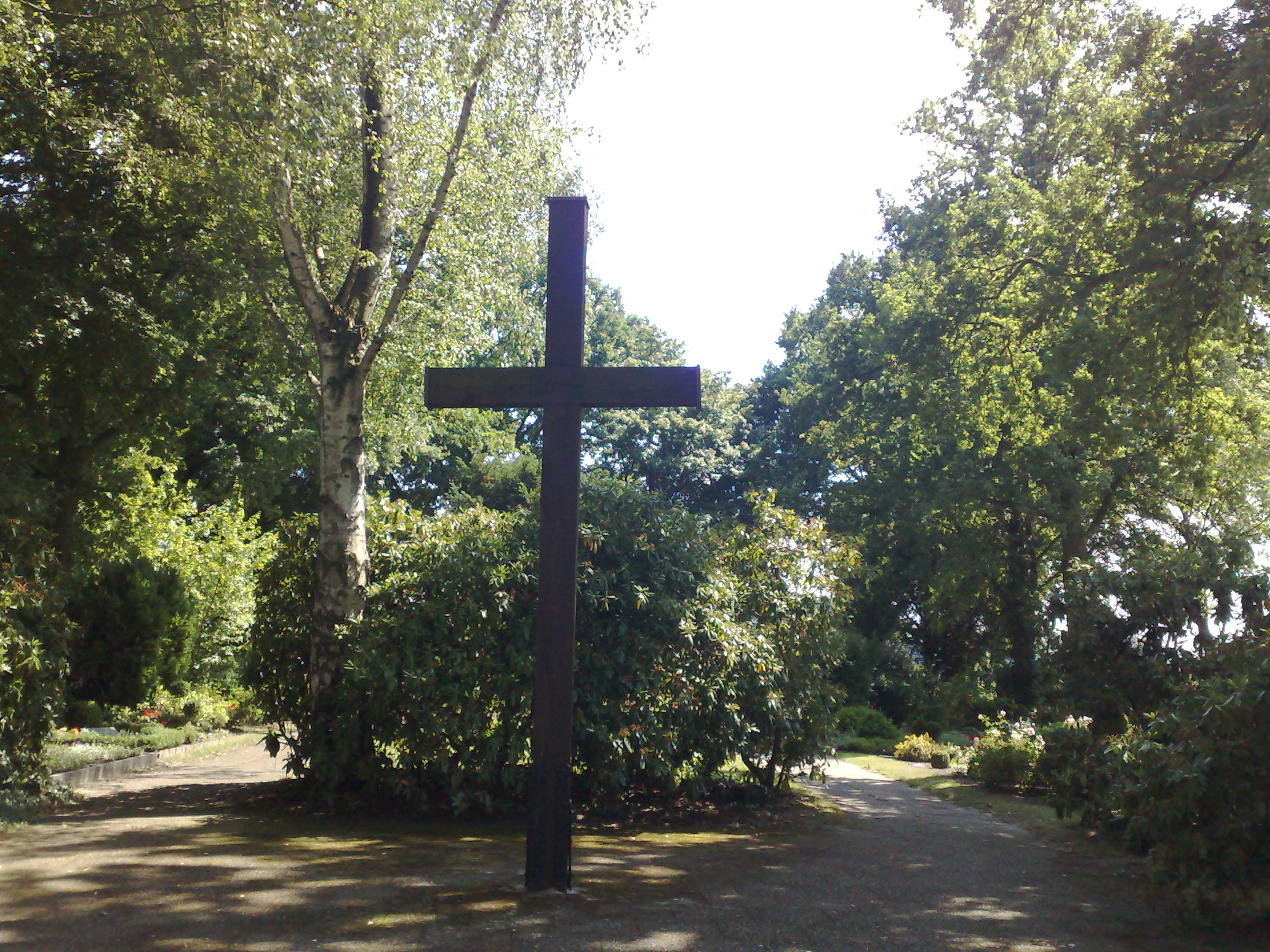
Giant cross at the cemetery

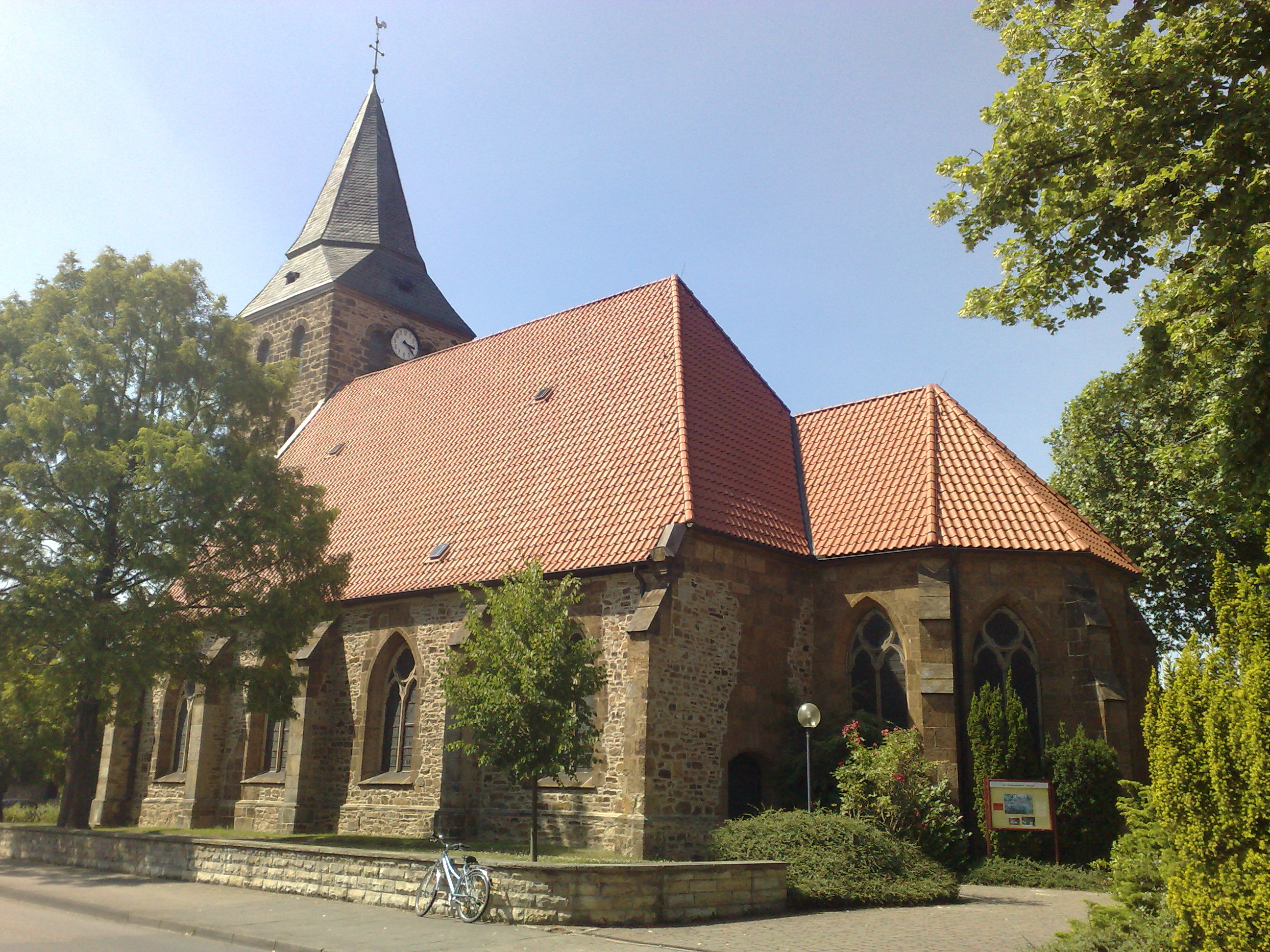
St. Andrew's Church (side view)

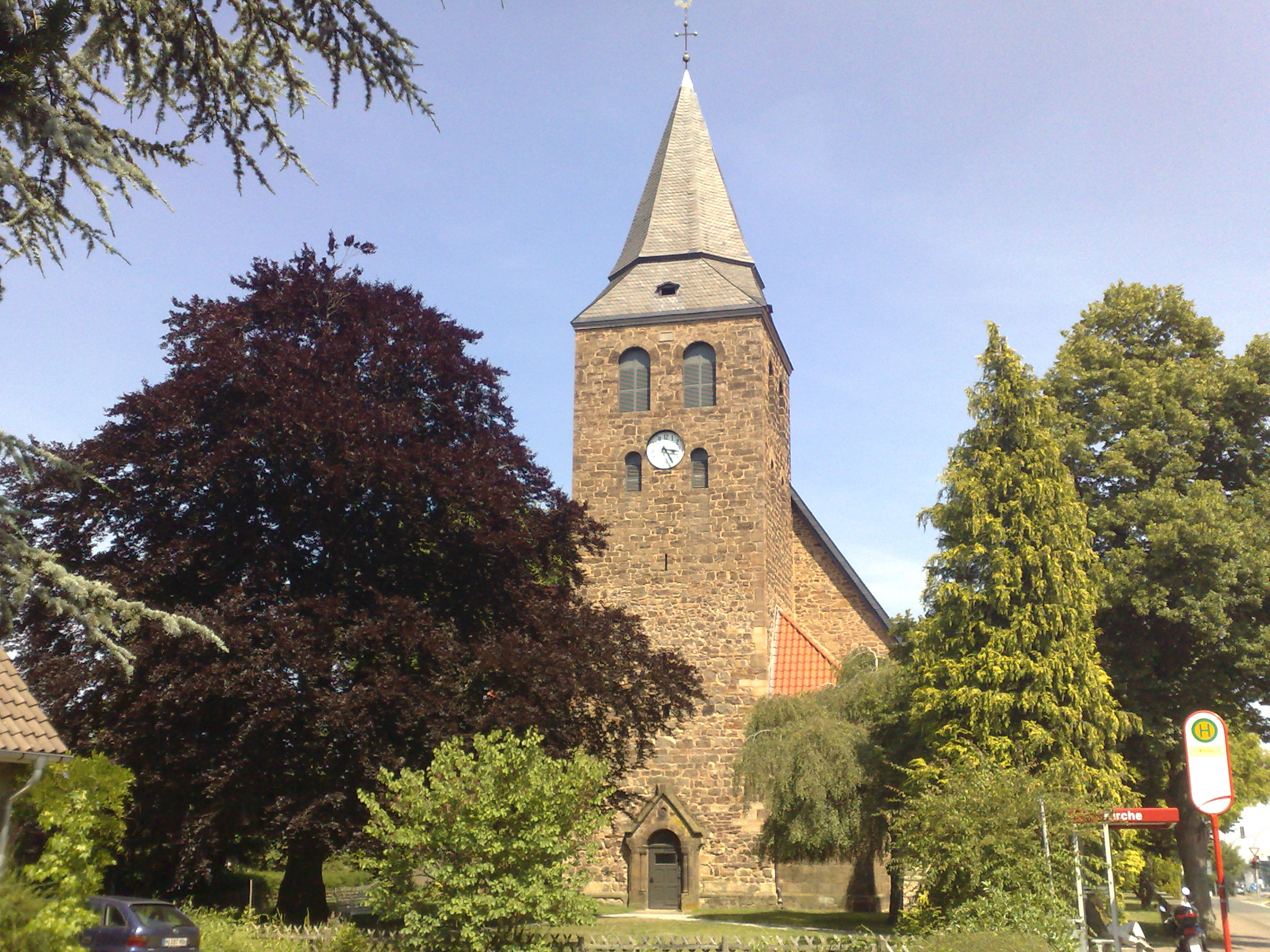
St. Andrew's Church (front)

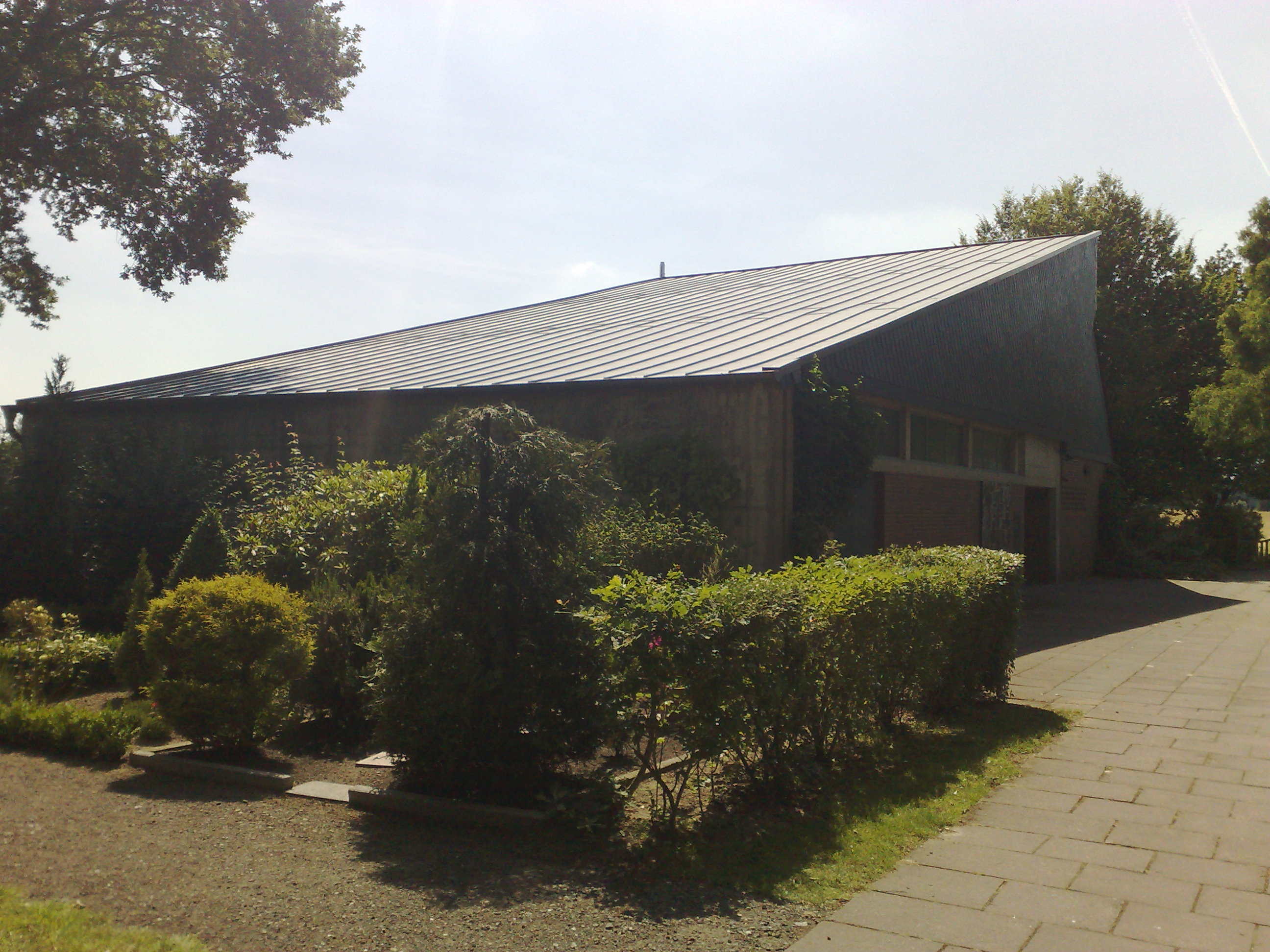
St. Andrew's Haseloh chapel

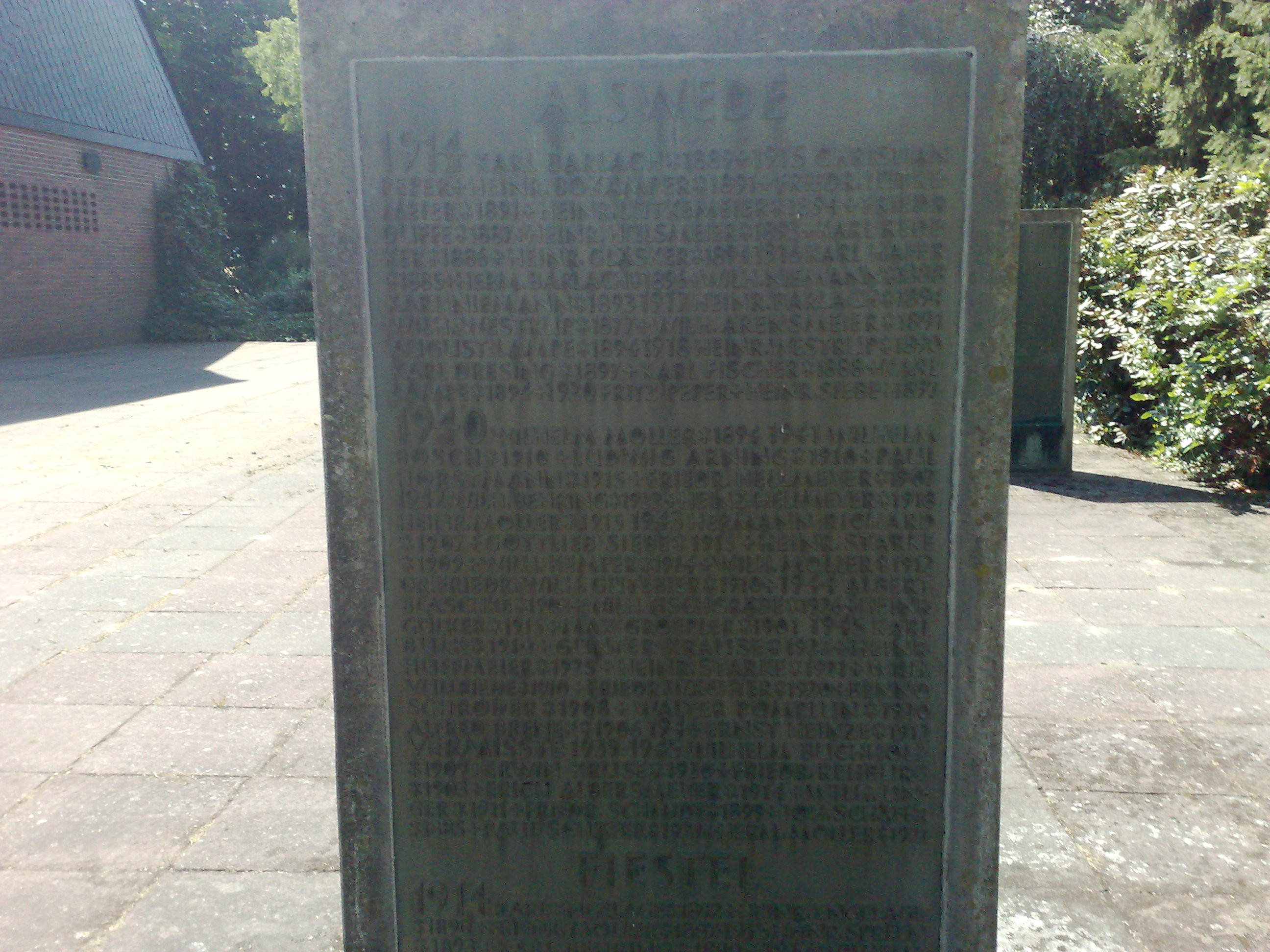
Memorial tablet for soldiers from Alswede

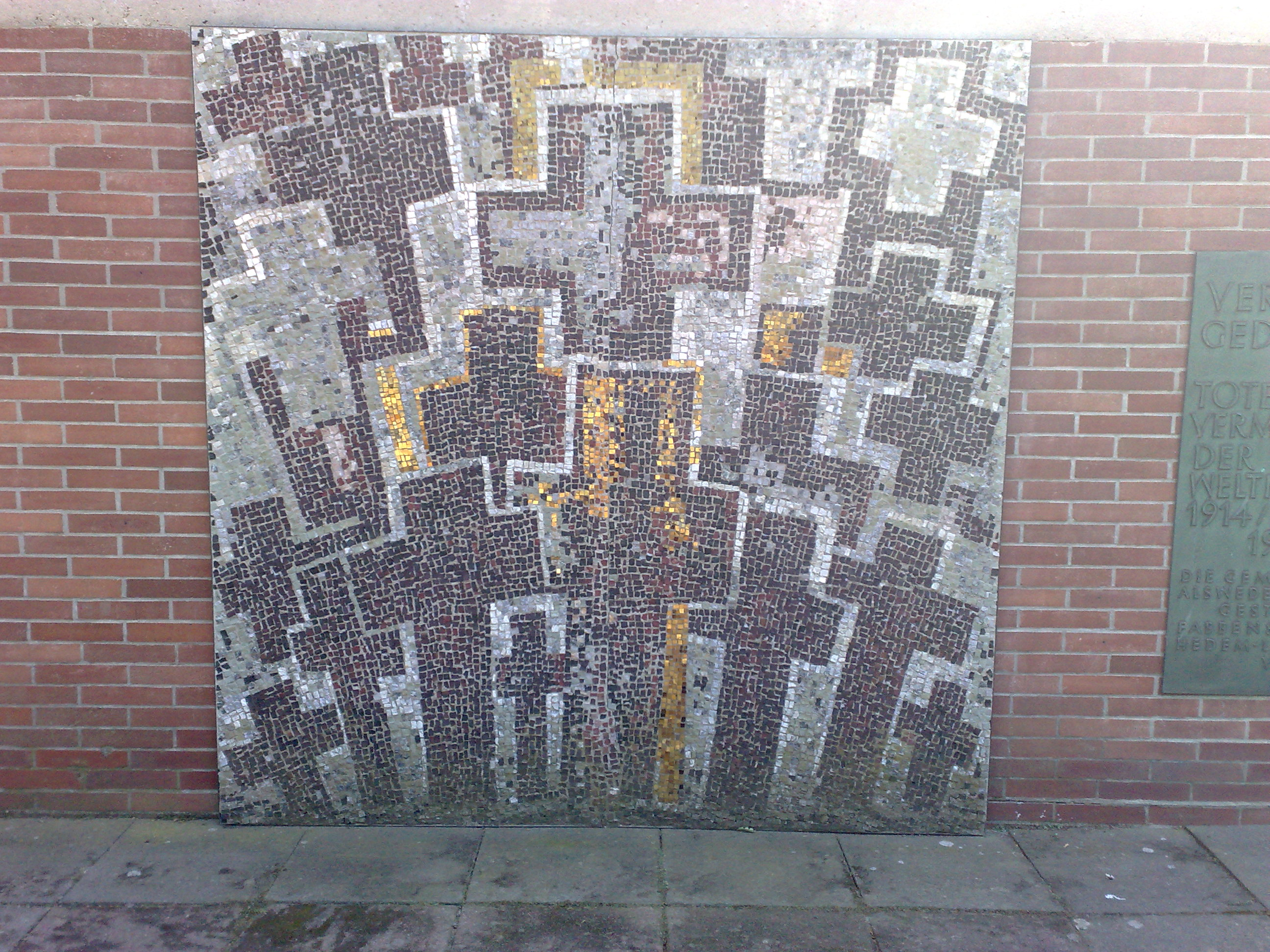
Gold cross in the mosaic in the chapel

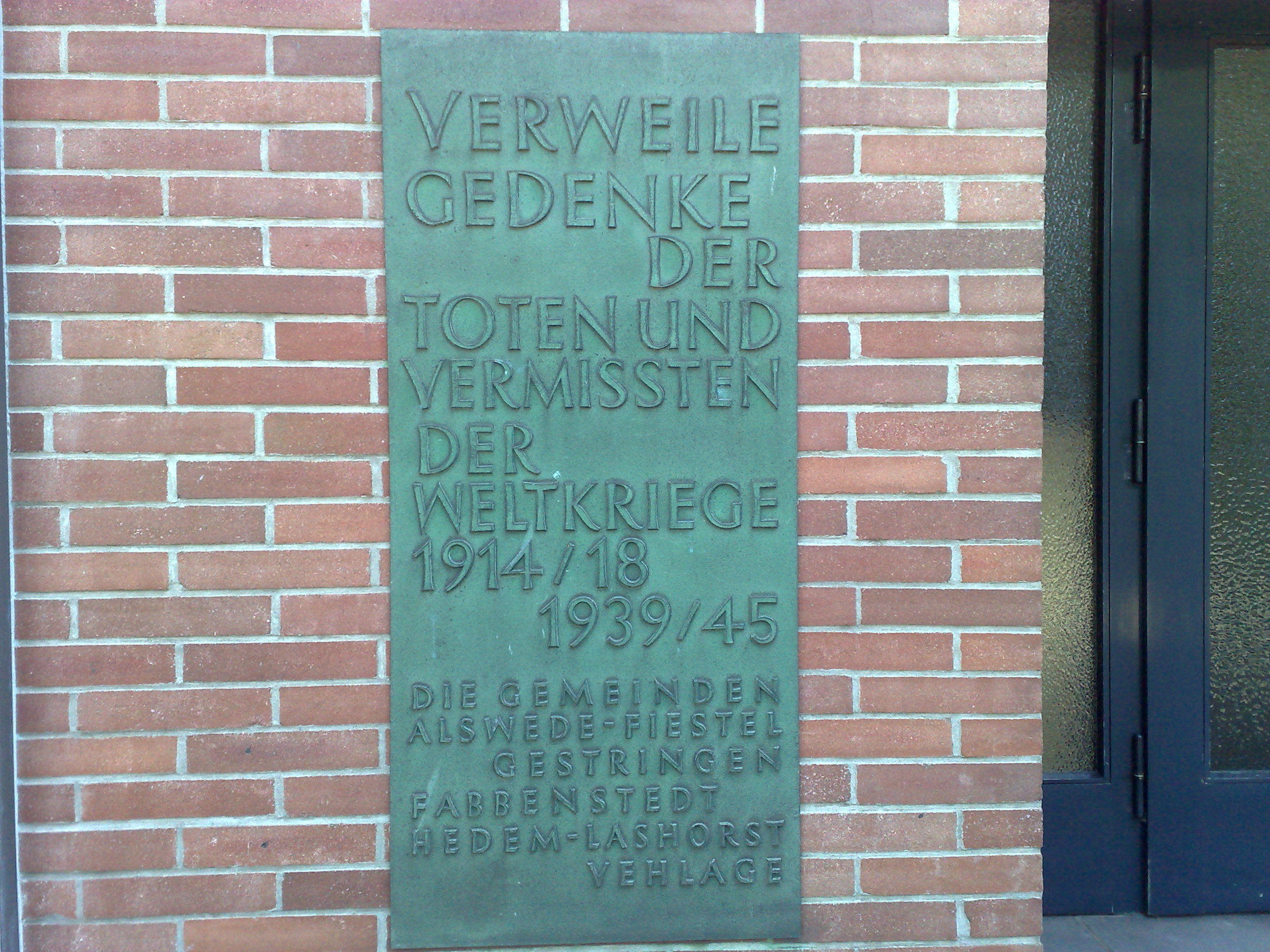
Memorial stones for soldiers who fell in the world wars

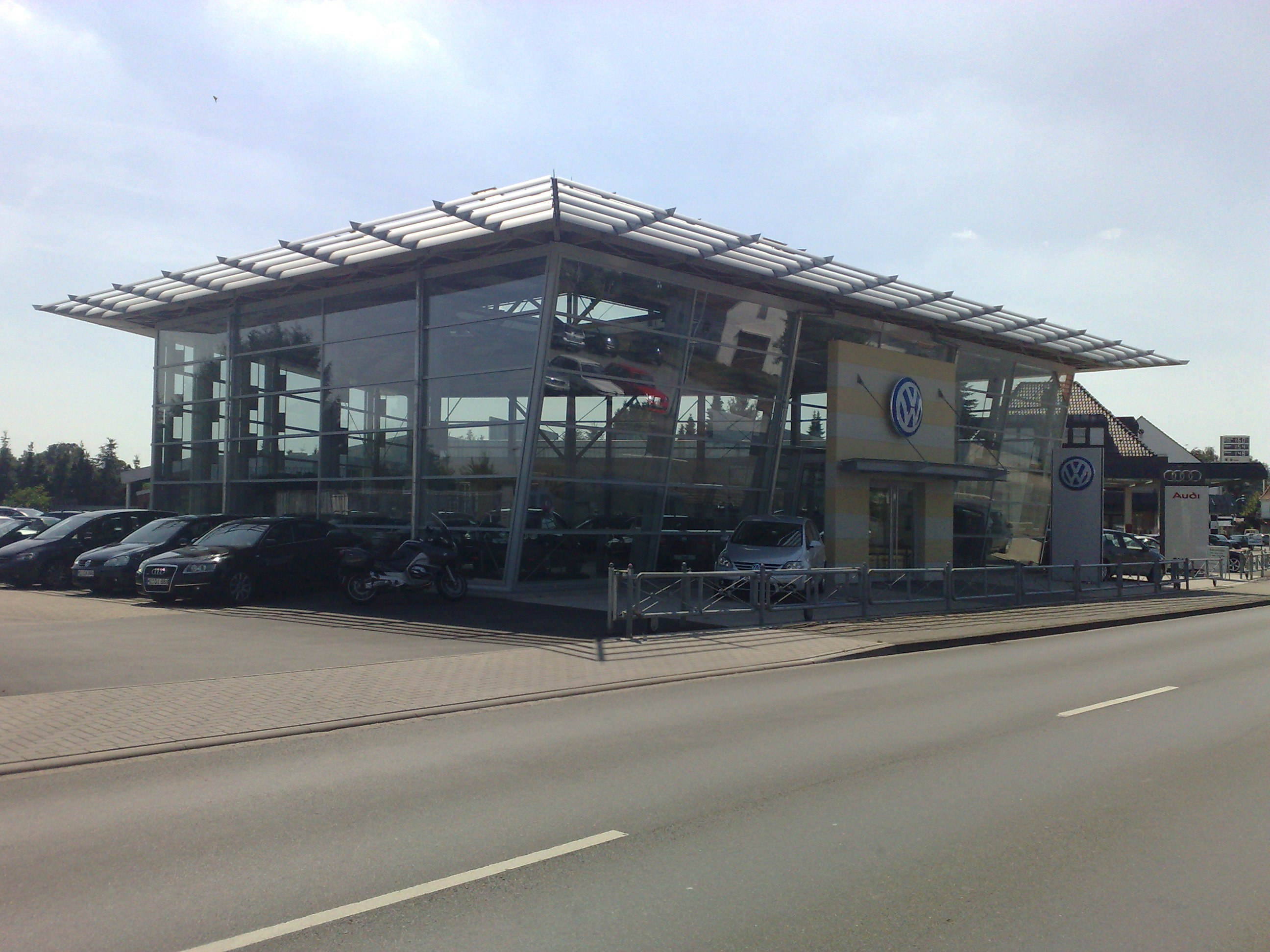
Garage

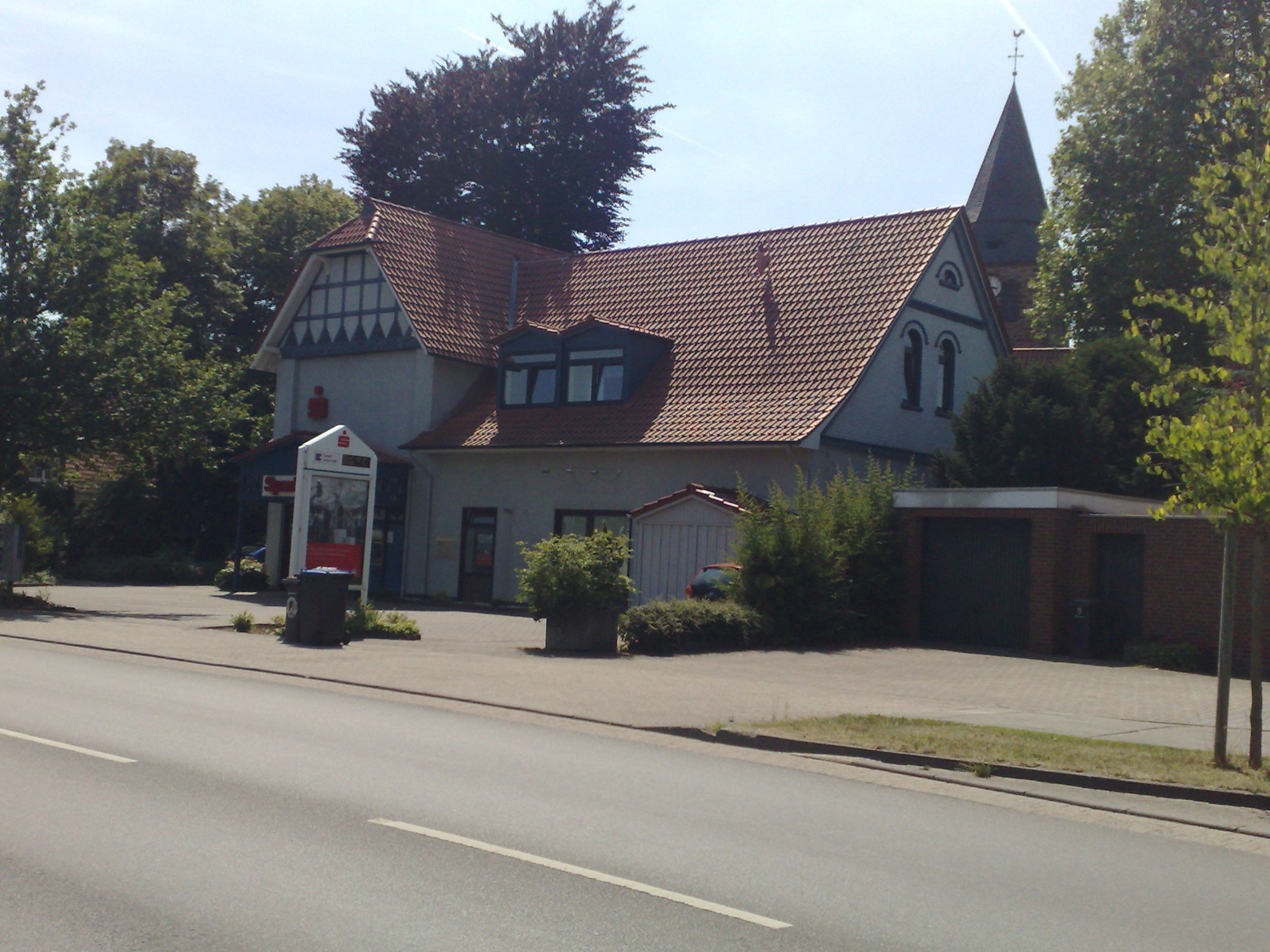
Sparkasse bank

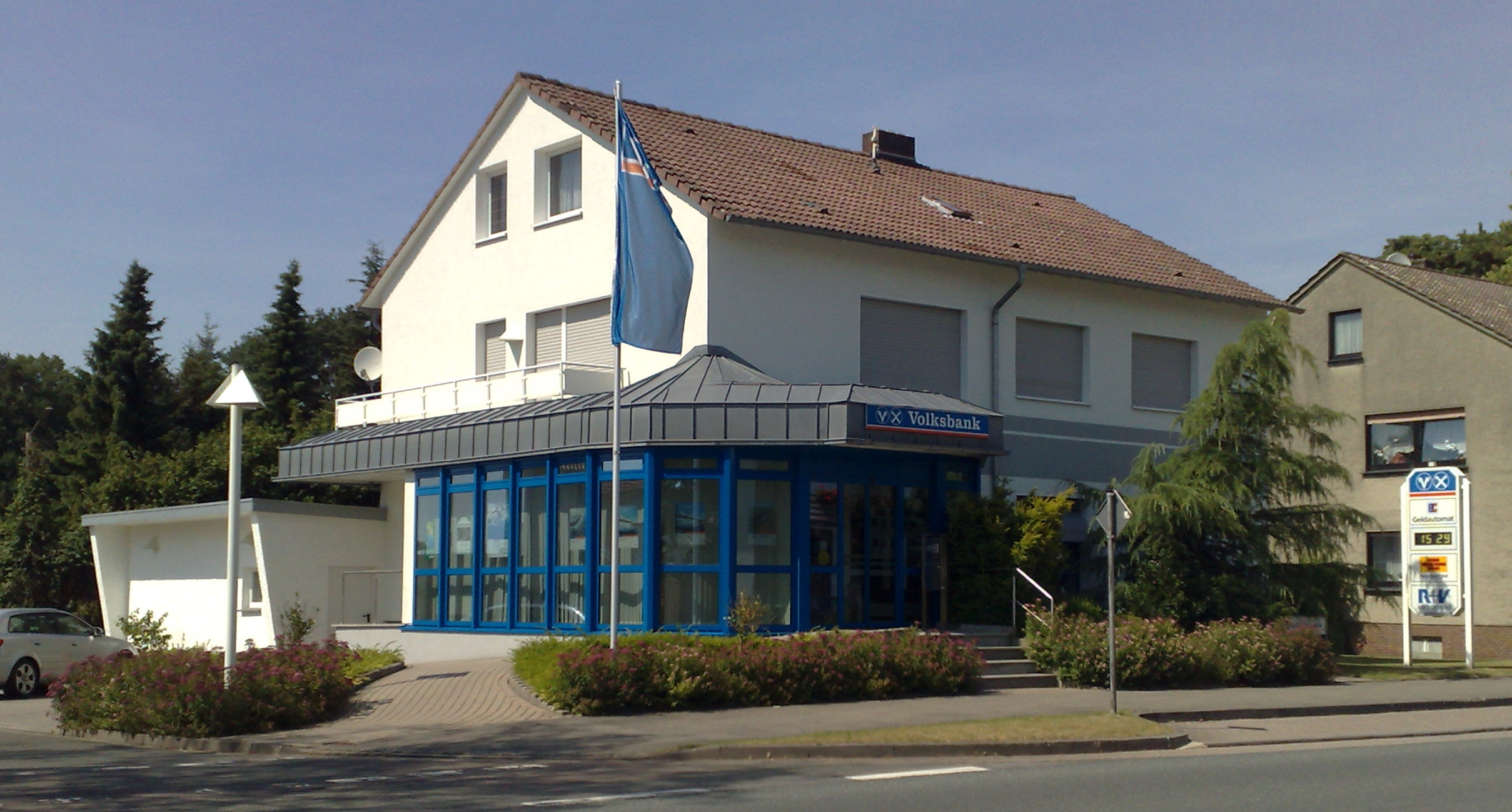
Genossenschaft Bank

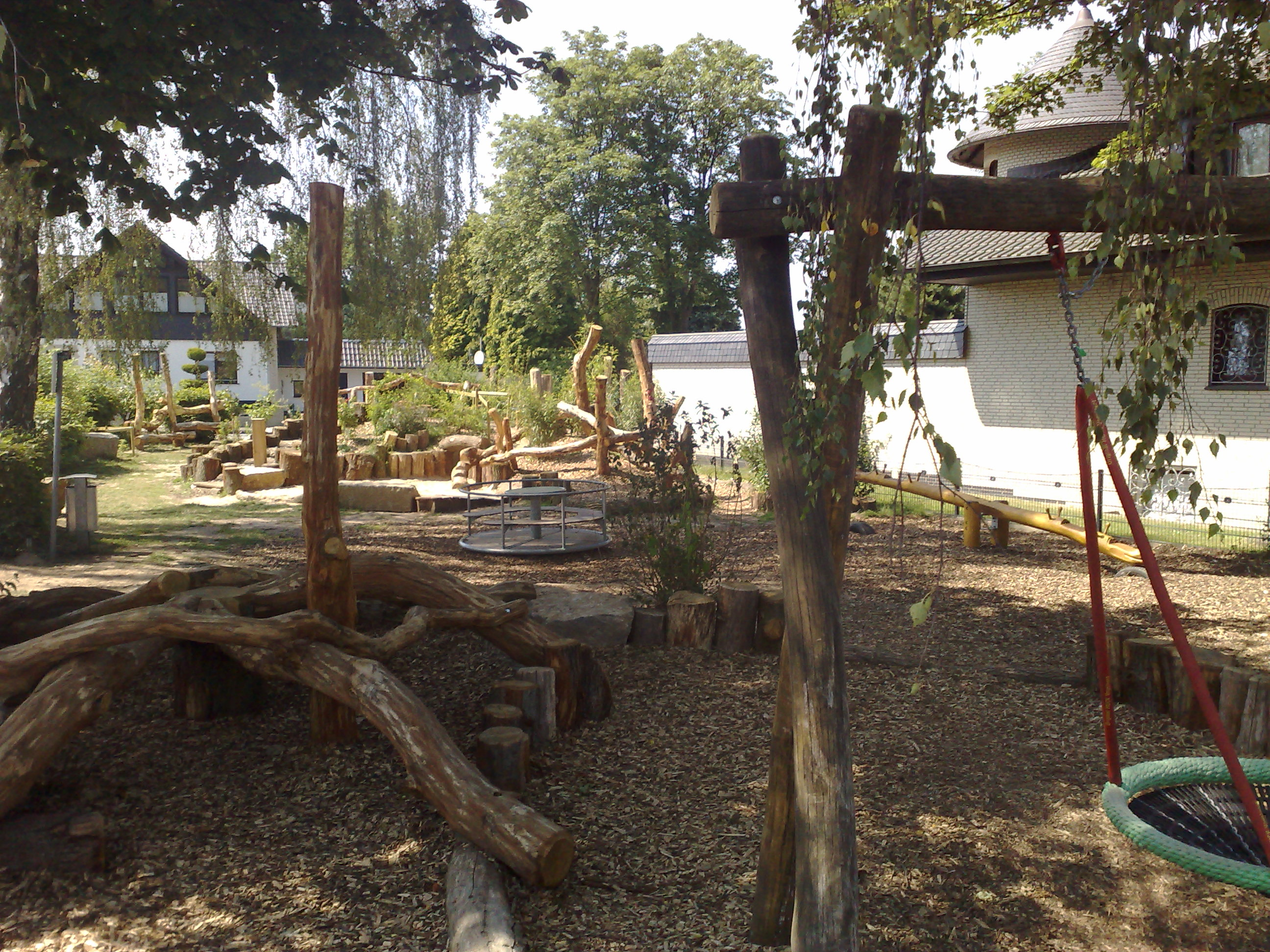
Playpark

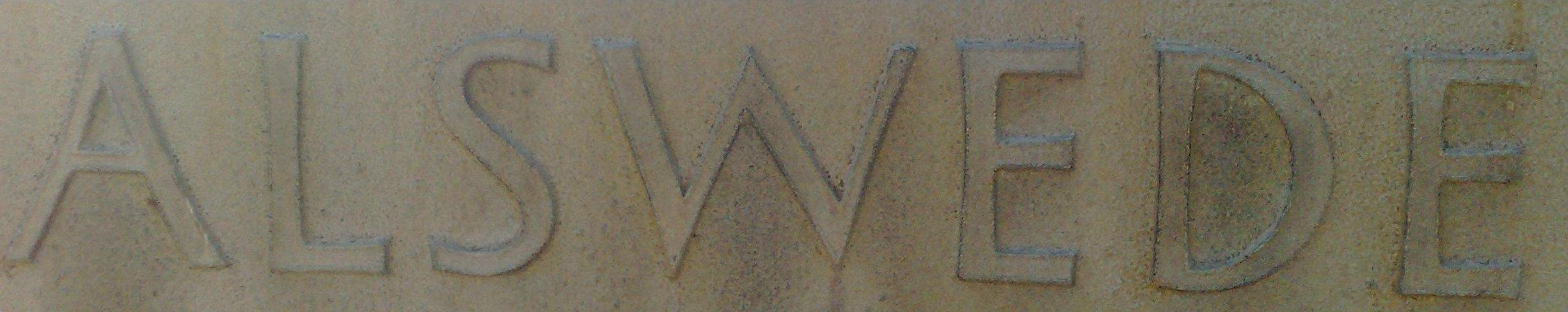
Alswede
