= Gehlenbeck =

- Ortsteil of Lübbecke
- Location of Gehlenbeck within Lübbecke
- Interactive map of Gehlenbeck
- Location within Germany Location within North Rhine-Westphalia
- Coordinates: 52°18′37″N 8°38′54″E
- Country: Germany
- State: North Rhine-Westphalia
- District: Minden-Lübbecke
- Town: Lübbecke

Area
  - Total: 11.13 km^{2} (4.30 sq mi)
- Elevation: 50–288 m (164–945 ft)

Population (2021)
  - Total: 3,280
  - Density: 295/km^{2} (763/sq mi)
- Time zone: UTC+01:00 (CET)
  - Summer (DST): UTC+02:00 (CEST)
- Postal codes: 32312
- Dialling codes: 05741

Gehlenbeck is a village in the East Westphalian borough of Lübbecke in the county of Minden-Lübbecke in North Germany. The former clustered village (Haufendorf) is the second most populous village today in the borough. A stream flows through the village, the Gehle Beke (High German: gelber Bach; English: "Yellow Brook"), that once gave its name to the village. The village's parish has an area of around 11 km^{2}. With 297 inhabitants per km^{2} Gehlenbeck is rather less densely settled than the borough of Lübbecke (398 people/km^{2}).

== Literature ==
- Werner Fabis: Gehlenbeck - Ein Dorf im Spiegel der Geschichte. Herausgeber: Heimatverein Gehlenbeck e. V.
