= Minden Coalfield =

Coordinates: 52°15′57″N 8°52′47″E

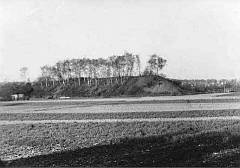
This spoil tip (the Schwarzer Hucken i.e. the "Black Back") in Bölhorst, for a long time recalled mining in the area

The Minden Coalfield (German: Mindener Revier) is located in the northern Wiehen foothills near the German town of Minden. Here, seams of Wealden Coal (Wealdenkohle) reach the surface of the earth in the Schaumburg Basin (Schaumburger Mulde). During the Thirty Years' War Swedish soldiers first discovered this black coal near Minden whilst preparing fieldworks on the Bölhorst. By 1663 it was forbidden to dig privately for coal and severe penalties were imposed for doing so.

A series of shaft systems were sunk increasingly deeper into the earth. Coal continued to be mined until 1 August 1958, for example in the Barsinghausen coalfield (Barsinghausener Revier) east of Minden in the Deister. The last mine in this coalfield was the Minden Coal Mine (Kohlenbergwerk Minden) in Meißen.

== Geology ==
The Wealden near Minden divides into the 150 m (490 ft) thick Lower Wealden Shale (Unterer Wealdenschieferton) and the 250 m (820 ft) thick Upper Wealden Shale (Oberer Wealdenschieferton). The 200 m (660 ft) thick bed of Wealden Sandstone east of the Weser is almost completely absent here. Below the Lower Shale are layers of Malm. The well-sealed shale results in the low water ingress from the hill range, but a high level of mine gas: 90 m^{3} (120 cu yd) of firedamp (CH_{4}) per ton of coal.

The beds descend steadily at an incline of 20 - 22° towards the north. Two large faults were discovered in the course of coal mining: The Rösche Fault (Rösche-Sprung, 60 m (200 ft)) and the Porta Fault (Porta-Verwerfung, 55 m (180 ft)). In the Lower Wealden Shale there are two coal seams. The main seam is 103 cm (41 in) thick (13 cm (5.1 in) of impure coal, 60 cm (24 in) of tailings and 31 cm (12 in) of pure coal), 32 cm (13 in) below is the secondary seam with 31 cm (12 in) of solid coal.

The main seam was abandoned in later years due to its lack of workability. The coal in the secondary seam has 22% volatile components and is categories as bituminous coal, low in gas. Its calorific value is 7,600 kcal/kg with a sulphur content of 8-9% as a result of iron sulphide.

== Sources ==
- Hans Röhrs: Erz und Kohle. Bergbau und Eisenhütten zwischen Ems und Weser. Ibbenbürener Vereinsdruckerei (IVD), Ibbenbüren 1992, 263 pp., ISBN 3-921290-62-7
- Thomas Krassmann: ''Materialien zur Geologie und zum Bergbau des Schaumburger Landes 2010
