= Limberg =

Limberg may refer to:

- Limberg is a village of the municipality Maissau, a town in the district of Hollabrunn in Lower Austria, Austria.
- Limberg bei Wies, municipality in the district of Deutschlandsberg in Styria, Austria.
- Limberg (grape), another name for the wine grape Blaufrankisch
- Limberg (Wiehen Hills), a hill in the Wiehen Hills, Germany, and site of Limberg Castle

== People ==
- Limberg Chero Ballena, professor from Perú
- Limberg Gutiérrez (b. 1977), Bolivian football (soccer) player
- Limberg Méndez (b. 1973), Bolivian football (soccer) player
- Kriemhild Limberg (born 1934), German discus thrower

== See also ==
- Limberger (disambiguation)
- Limburg (disambiguation)
