= PrivatAir =

Swiss airline

IATA	ICAO	Call sign
PV	PTI	PRIVATAIR
- Founded: 1977
- Ceased operations: 5 December 2018
- Alliance: AirClub
- Subsidiaries: PrivatAir Deutschland
- Fleet size: 5
- Headquarters: Baar, Switzerland
- Key people: Thomas Limberger, Chairman
- Website: privatair.com

Privatair SA was a Swiss airline headquartered in Meyrin, which operated business jets as well as scheduled services on behalf of major airlines. In addition the company operated crew and pilot training facilities. PrivatAir SA was a registered air carrier with two air operator's certificates, in Switzerland and through its subsidiary PrivatAir GmbH in Germany. On 5 December 2018, PrivatAir filed for insolvency and ceased operations.

== History ==
PrivatAir was founded in 1977 as a corporate flying division of the Latsis family under the name Petrolair. In 1979, air traffic began on a Boeing 737-200 and offered business travel flights. In 1989, a Boeing 757 and a Gulfstream IV were added, and the name was changed to PrivatAir. On June 1, 1995, the company was then licensed by the Swiss Federal Office of Civil Aviation as a commercial airline.

In March 2001 the PrivatAir Group was formed. Also in March 2001, the PrivatAir Group gained ETOPS 180 minutes and FAA 129 Foreign Carrier approval as a designated carrier under the US-Switzerland bilateral "open skies" agreement. These approvals allow the company to offer the most direct routes across the Atlantic and Pacific Oceans and unlimited operations to the US. At the time, PrivatAir was the only ad hoc commercial charter operator in the world with these approvals.

In February 2002, PrivatAir completed the construction of its private terminal in Geneva, where its headquarters were then based. The new "C3" terminal was a joint venture between PrivatAir and Geneva International Airport and offered VIP passenger services to PrivatAir's customers. The corporate jet alliance AirClub was founded in Geneva in October 2012. In 2018 AirClub had eight members aside PrivatAir: ACM Air Charter, Air Alsie, Air Hamburg, Corporatejets, FLYINGGROUP, GlobeAir, London Executive Aviation and Masterjet.

In May 2003, PrivatAir and Swissport created the joint company PrivatPort, which is an executive-jet handling business. In October 2003, German subsidiary PrivatAir Germany GmbH, Düsseldorf, gained JAR – 145 approval from the German civil aviation authority, giving the company more autonomy and flexibility within the framework of its operations on behalf of Lufthansa and Airbus.

January 2005, PrivateAir flew Newark to Zurich under the LX18/19 flight numbers with a Boeing BBJ / BBJ2 with 56 all business class seats.

In November 2016, the majority of the company (51%) was taken over by the British investment company SilverArrow Capital.

In October 2018, the German aviation authorities suspended the licence of PrivatAir's German subsidiary. On 5 December 2018, PrivatAir announced the end of operations and filed for insolvency for both its Swiss and German business units, citing negative commercial developments.

== Company overview ==
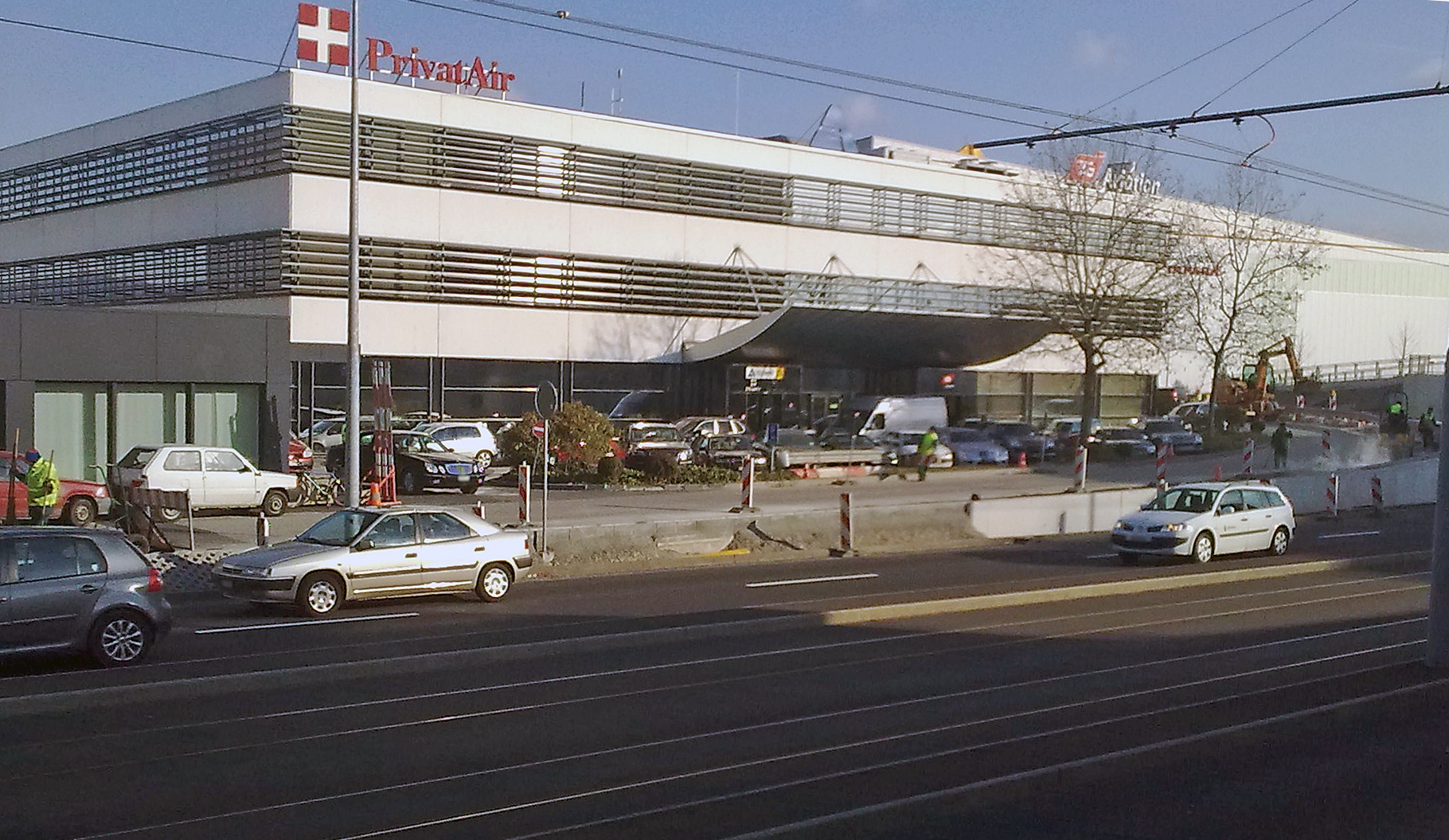
Head office of PrivatAir in Meyrin

PrivatAir was made up of three divisions: Scheduled Services, Business Aviation which included aircraft management, charter, sales and PrivatTraining:

- PrivatAir specialised in scheduled and charter flights using mid-sized, long-range jets. Its main base is Geneva Airport and its contracted operational bases depend of the current scheduled operations contracts, e. g. Frankfurt Airport operating for Lufthansa.
- PrivatAir's Business Aviation department provided service covering Aircraft Management, Aircraft Sales & Acquisitions, Aircraft Charter, AirClub (corporate jet alliance), PrivatJetFuel (Fuel Management) and Ground Services (PrivatPort).
- PrivatTraining was an in-house training department focusing on safety, security and service in the industry. They also provide training programmes for private-jet operators, to help them fulfil regulatory obligations.

== Operations ==
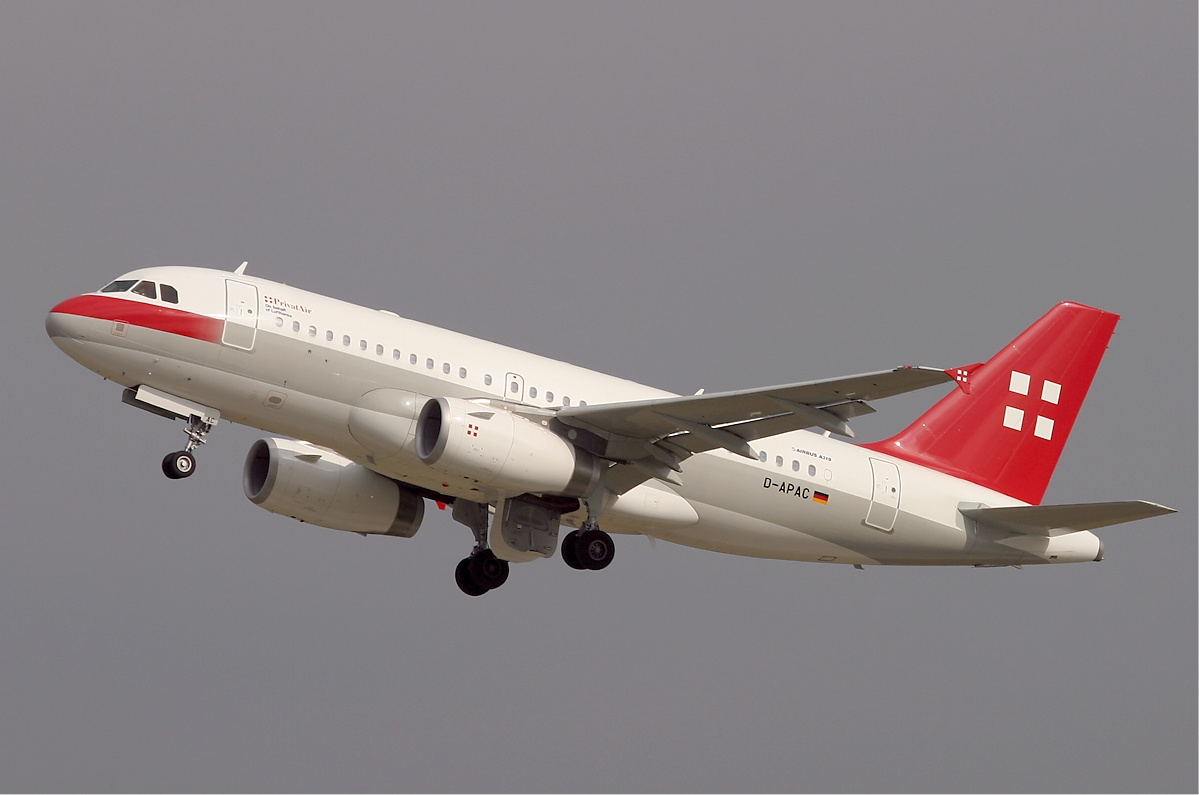
PrivatAir Airbus A319CJ

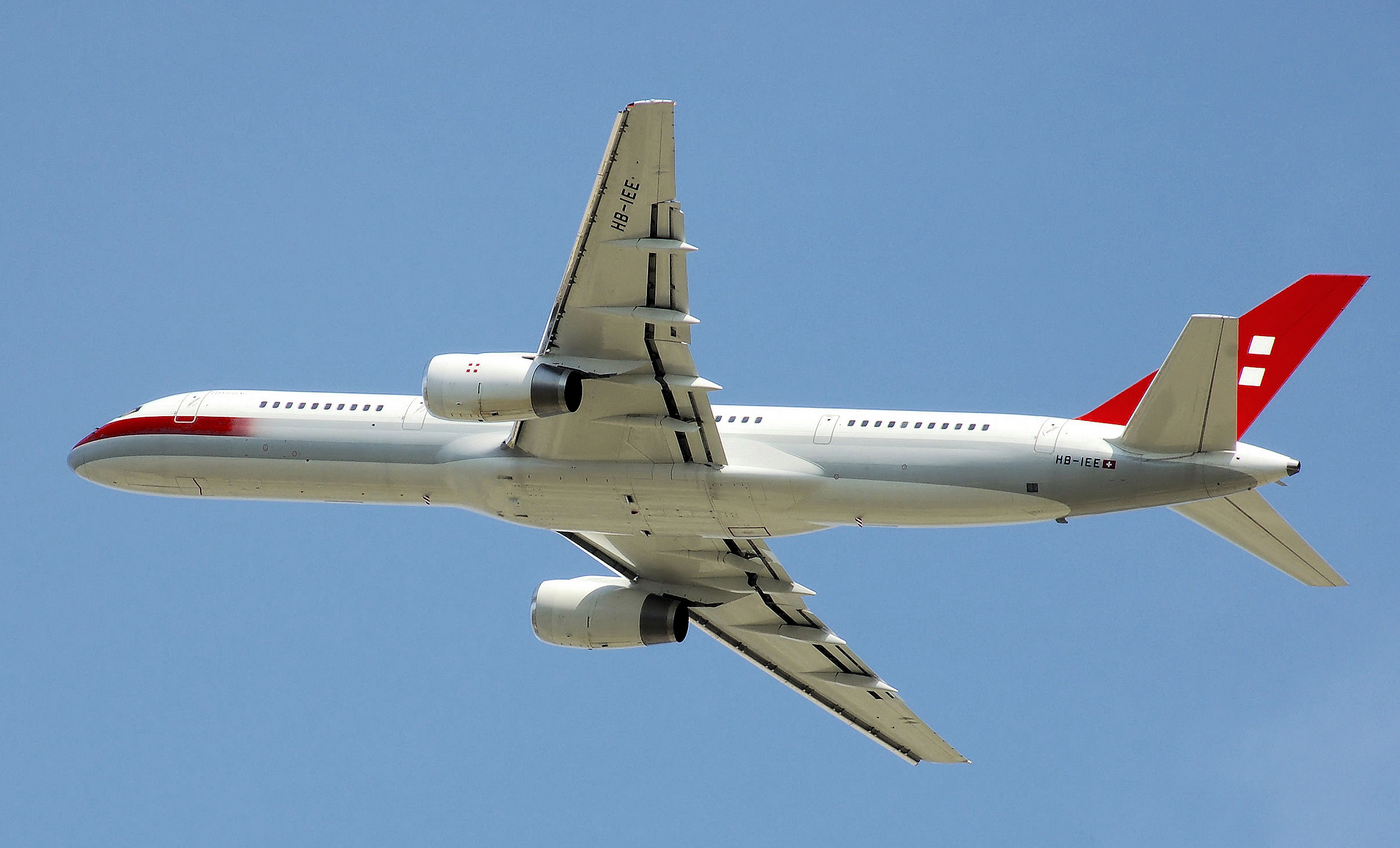
A former PrivatAir Boeing 757-200

Aside from private and corporate charter services, PrivatAir also operated its aircraft on behalf of different international airlines on a long-term basis for scheduled flights.

Between 2005 and 2011 Privatair flew daily flights, except Wednesdays, between Amsterdam Schiphol Airport and Houston for KLM, with a 44 all business class BBJ Boeing business jet in addition to KLM's own daily flight.

From June 2002 to June 2008, Privatair operated on behalf of Lufthansa a non-stop transatlantic service from Düsseldorf to Newark near New York City. To record, this was the first transatlantic flight which took off exclusively with Business Class. For this purpose the German subsidiary PrivatAir GmbH with legal seat in Duesseldorf, Germany was created, which operated not only the four Airbus in own responsibility, but was responsible for all maintenance of the group airplanes. In addition the company added three Boeing business jets.

From 2003 to 2008, PrivatAir carried out charter traffic for Airbus between the plants in Hamburg-Finkenwerder and Toulouse. This was subsequently taken over by OLT Express Germany. PrivatAir also operated a variety of other regular scheduled flights on behalf major airlines such as Lufthansa from Frankfurt to Pune and Nairobi and for Saudia on domestic services.

In April 2015, Lufthansa announced it would reduce their involvement with PrivatAir with the route from Frankfurt to Dammam to be shut down by the end of October 2015. PrivatAir also operated flights to Libreville, Pointe-Noire, Accra, Bahrain and Tel Aviv on behalf of Lufthansa; these routes were all terminated a few years earlier. A route operated for Lufthansa to Nairobi ended on 31 August 2016. PrivatAir also operated aircraft on behalf of ECAir based at Maya-Maya Airport until 10 October 2016, when ECAir suspended its operations.

Between March 2016 and October 2017, PrivatAir operated a Boeing 737 on behalf of Scandinavian Airlines between Copenhagen and Boston.

As of 2017, PrivatAir also operated on selected routes for companies such as TUI fly Deutschland and Eurowings on leisure routes from Germany after the collapse of Air Berlin. In July 2018, Lufthansa suspended its route between Frankfurt and Pune, India which had been served by PrivatAir for several years. The route resumed in autumn 2018, however operated by Lufthansa's own aircraft.

== Fleet ==
As of December 2018, the joint PrivatAir fleet registered in Switzerland and Germany consisted of the following aircraft. Additionally, PrivatAir operated several business jets from Dassault, Bombardier and Gulfstream.

Aircraft	In service	Orders	Notes
Airbus A220-100	—	5	
Airbus A319CJ	3	—	operated by PrivatAir Switzerland for Saudia Private Aviation
Boeing BBJ	2	—	operated by PrivatAir Germany; stored
Total	5	5	

PrivatAir previously also operated more and a wider range of aircraft including Boeing 757 and 767s.
