= List of airlines of Germany =

This is a list of current airlines of Germany.

== Scheduled airlines ==
Airline	IATA	ICAO	Callsign	Image	Commenced operations	Notes
Condor	DE	CFG	CONDOR		1955	Condor Berlin (1997–2013) merged into Condor
Discover Airlines	4Y	OCN	OCEAN		2023	Uses previous IATA code of Germanwings
Eurowings	EW	EWG	EUROWINGS		1993	NFD - Nürnberger Flugdienst (1975–1992) merged into Eurowings; RFG - Regionalflug (1976–1992) merged into Eurowings; GWI - Germanwings merged into Eurowings due to COVID-19 pandemic
FLN Frisia Luftverkehr		FRS			2014	Rebranded from Frisia-Luftverkehr Norddeich (1969–2014) LFH - Luftverkehr Friesland Harle (1983–2014) merged into FLN - Die Inselflieger
Lufthansa	LH	DLH	LUFTHANSA		1926	Flag carrier. Südflug International (1952–1968) merged into Lufthansa on 2 January 1968
Lufthansa City Airlines	VL	LHX	CITY AIR		2024	Subsidiary of Lufthansa, independent of Lufthansa CityLine
OFD Ostfriesischer Flugdienst					2011	Rebranded from OLT - Ostfriesische Lufttransport (1958–2011)
TUI fly Deutschland	X3	TUI	TUI JET		2006	Rebranded from Hapag-Lloyd Express (2002–2006); Hapagfly (2005–2007) merged into TUIfly (Germany), later rebranded TUI fly Deutschland

== Charter airlines ==
Airline	IATA	ICAO	Callsign	Image	Commenced operations	Notes
ACM Air Charter		BVR	BAVARIAN		1992	
ADAC Luftrettung					1970	
Aero-Dienst		ADN	AERODIENST		1958	
Air Hamburg	HH	AHO	AIR HAMBURG		2001	
Air Independence		JTV	JUNIOR		1998	
air-taxi europe	TZ	TWG	TWIN-GOOSE		2005	
AirGO Flugservice		XGO	PASTIS			
Arcus-Air	ZE	AZE	ARCUS AIR		1973	
Avanti Air		ATV	AVANTI AIR		1994	
Businesswings		JMP	JUMP RUN		1989	
DC Aviation		DCS	TWIN STAR		2007	Rebranded from DaimlerChrysler Aviation (1998–2007); Cirrus Aviation (2001–2008) merged into DC Aviation
Deutsche Lufthansa Berlin-Stiftung						
Deutsche Zeppelin Reederei					2001	
DRF Stiftung Luftrettung gemeinnützige	1I	AMB	CIVIL AIR AMBULANCE		1972	
FAI rent-a-jet		IFA	RED ANGLE			
German Regional Airlines	WH	WDL	WDL		1955	
Hahn Air	HR	HHN	ROOSTER		1994	
Jet Executive		JEI	JET EXECUTIVE			
K5 Aviation		KAY	KAYAK			
LEAV Aviation	KK	NGN	YODA		2022	
PrivatAir (Germany)		PTG			2003	
Private Wings	8W	PWF	PRIVATE WINGS		1991	
RWL German Flight Academy	DZ	RWL	RHEINTRAINER			
Stuttgarter Flugdienst		FFD	FIRST FLIGHT			
Südflug International		SZ	SUEDFLUG		1952	
Sundair	SR	SDR	SUNDAIR		2017	
Sylt Air	7E	AWU	SYLT-AIR		1963	Scheduled flights in the summer season
Wiking Helikopter Service		WHS	WEEKING			
Windrose Air		QGA	QUADRIGA			

== Cargo airlines ==
Airline	IATA	ICAO	Callsign	Image	Commenced operations	Notes
AeroLogic	3S	BOX	GERMAN CARGO		2009	
European Air Transport Leipzig	QY	BCS	POSTMAN		2010	Rebranded from EAT - European Air Transport (1971–2010)
Lufthansa Cargo	LH	GEC	LUFTHANSA CARGO		1993	Rebranded from German Cargo (1977–1993)
CargoLogic Germany		GCL	SAXONIA			

== See also ==
- Airline codes
- List of airports in Germany
- List of defunct airlines of Germany
- List of airlines of Europe
