= Gustav Engel =

Gustav Engel may refer to:

- Gustav Engel (historian)
- Gustav Engel (musician)
