= Limburg =

Limburg or Limbourg may refer to:

== Regions ==
- Limburg (Belgium), a province since 1839 in the Flanders region of Belgium
- Limburg (Netherlands), a province since 1839 in the south of the Netherlands
- Diocese of Limburg, Roman Catholic Diocese in Germany
- Province of Limburg (1815–1839), a former province of the United Kingdom of the Netherlands
- Duchy of Limburg (1065–1794), a state in the Holy Roman Empire
- Duchy of Limburg (1839–1867), a part of the German Confederation
- Limburg of the States (1633–1685), one of the Generality Lands, a dependent territory of the United Provinces of the Netherlands

== Other places ==
- Limbourg, a town in Liège, Wallonia, Belgium
- Limburg (Weilheim an der Teck), a mountain in Baden-Württemberg, Germany
- Limburg an der Lahn, a city, the district seat of Limburg-Weilburg, Hesse, Germany
- Limburg an der Lenne, now called Hagen-Hohenlimburg, North Rhine-Westphalia, Germany, the former chief town of the county of Limburg-Hohenlimburg
- Limburg, a castle in Sasbach am Kaiserstuhl, Baden-Württemberg, Germany
- Limburg Abbey, a ruined abbey near Bad Dürkheim, Rhineland-Palatinate, Germany
- Limburg Airfield, an abandoned World War II military airfield near Limburg an der Lahn, Hessen, Germany

== People ==
- Limbourg brothers (fl. 1385–1416), Dutch painters Herman, Paul, and Johan
- Various members of the German higher nobility and mediatised House of Limburg-Stirum
- Baermann of Limburg, German writer
- Helge Limburg (born 1982), German politician
- Olga Limburg (1881–1970), German actor
- Peter Limbourg (born 1960), German journalist

== Other uses ==
- Limburg (tanker), a French oil tanker bombed off Yemen
- HNLMS Limburg (D814), a destroyer of the Dutch navy

== See also ==
- Limberg (disambiguation)
- Limburg-Weilburg, a Kreis (district) in the west of Hesse, Germany
- Limburgish, a language
- Limburger, a cheese
