= Baermann =

Baermann, sometimes given as Bärmann or Barmann, is a surname and given name. Notable people with this surname include the following:

- Baermann of Limburg (fl. 1712 – c. 1713), German writer
- Carl Baermann (1810–1885), German clarinetist and composer
- Carl Baermann (pianist) (1839–1913), German-born American pianist and composer
- Gustav Karl Theodor Friedrich Baermann (1877–1950), German medical doctor and researcher
- Heinrich Baermann (1784–1847), German clarinetist
