= SNCF Class CC 1100 =

Class of Pre WW2 French electric locomotives

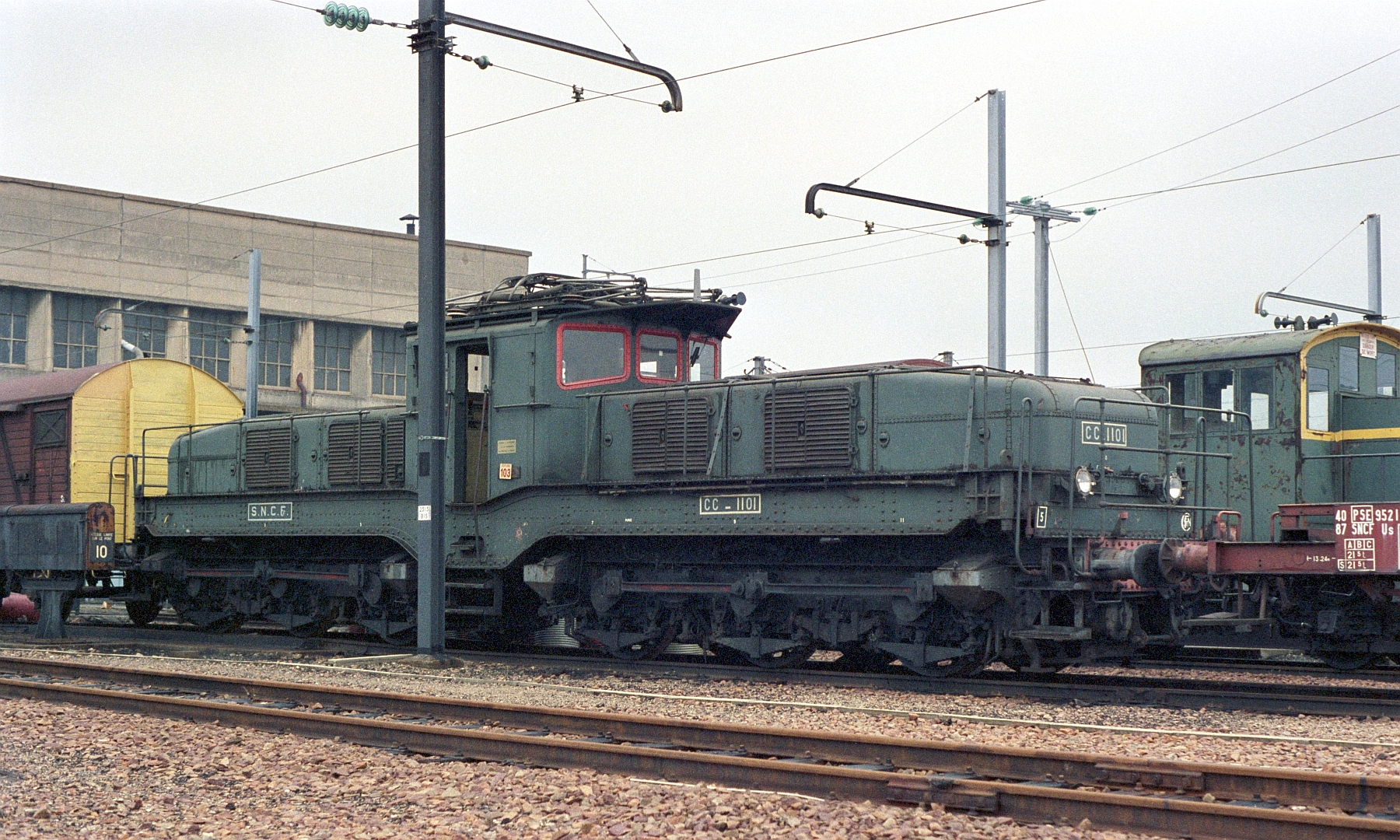
- CC 1101 at Villeneuve-Saint-Georges in 1986
Type and origin
- Power type: Electric
- Builder: Batignolles-Châtillon/Oerlikon
- Build date: 1937–1948
- Total produced: 12
- Rebuild date: 1989–1995
Specifications
- Configuration
  - Whyte: 0-6-6-0
  - UIC: C′C′
- Gauge: 1,435 mm (4 ft 8 1/2 in)
- Wheel diameter: 1,400 mm (55 in)
- Length
  - Over body: 17.910 m (58 ft 9.1 in)
- Loco weight: 91 t (90 long tons; 100 short tons)
- Electric system/s: 1500 V dc
- Current pickup(s): Pantograph
- Transmission: Mechanical
Performance figures
- Maximum speed: 25 km/h (16 mph)
- Power output
  - Continuous: 400 kW (540 hp)
- Tractive effort: 183 kN (41,000 lb_{f})
Career
- Operators: SNCF
- Class: CC 1100
- Number in class: 25
- Numbers: E 1001–E 1012; CC 1101–CC 1112
- Nicknames: Mille-plats (Centipede)
- Preserved: CC 1110

The SNCF Class CC 1100 was a class of 12 centre cab electric shunting locomotives, the first two of which were originally ordered for the PO-Midi. Originally numbered E 1001–E 1012, under the 1950 SNCF renumbering they became CC 1101–CC 1112. They were built by Batignolles-Châtillon and Oerlikon, the first two, E 1001 and E 1002, in 1937 and the remaining ten, E 1003–E 1012, between 1943 and 1948. Completely rebuilt between 1989 and 1995, the last was withdrawn from service in 2005.

== Description ==
=== Design considerations ===
At the time of ordering, decommissioned main-line locomotives of Class BB 1320 and Class BB 1420 were used for shunting purposes in marshalling yards. This was not entirely satisfactory for several reasons: their tractive effort was insufficient at low speed, the cooling of their rheostats was a problem and the BB type suffered from limited adhesion but had an axle load which may be too great for the yard tracks. In response to these problems, the Paris-Orléans company considered the creation of a class of locomotives with specific characteristics specially designed for shunting in marshalling yards.

=== A Franco-Swiss construction ===
Following an invitation to tender, the construction of the locomotives was entrusted to Batignolles-Châtillon for the mechanical parts and Oerlikon for the electrical equipment. Two prototypes were ordered in 1934, delivered in 1937 and put into service the following year by the newly created SNCF. In view of the good results obtained, an order for ten additional locomotives was placed on 25 April 1940; delayed by the Second World War, the delivery of these locomotives took place between 1943 and 1948.

=== Technical description ===
The locomotives were 17.910 m (58.76 ft) long and weighed 91 t (90 long tons; 100 short tons). A continuously rotating Ward Leonard rotary converter provided sufficient tractive effort at low speed, despite a relatively low continuous power of 400 kW (540 hp), and without releasing much heat, because it supplied a fixed current of 300 amps at a variable voltage of 0 to 1500 volts dc. The class CC 1100 were able to propel trains of 2,000–2,500 t (2,000–2,500 long tons; 2,200–2,800 short tons). A single, central cab reduced wiring costs and improved operator vision; it was framed by two, externally identical, covers which housed the circuit breaker and the batteries on one side, and the rotary converter on the other. Bogies with three axles coupled by connecting rods, of which only the end axles were motorized, made it a locomotive with full adhesion but with low axle load; it was the bogies, which were also interconnected, which supported the couplings and the buffers, the chassis not participating in the traction force. The current was collected by a single pantograph placed on the roof of the driver's cab. The locomotives were equipped with regenerative braking, and the speed was limited to 30 km/h (19 mph). After dismantling the linkages, they could be moved from one yard to another at 50 km/h (31 mph), but this possibility was not used in practice: partially dismantled, they were transported on flat wagons.

These characteristics make it the only series of locomotives specially designed for yard service in France. Also designed for yard service, the BB 1002-BB 1003 were not originally intended for use in France.

=== Modernisation ===
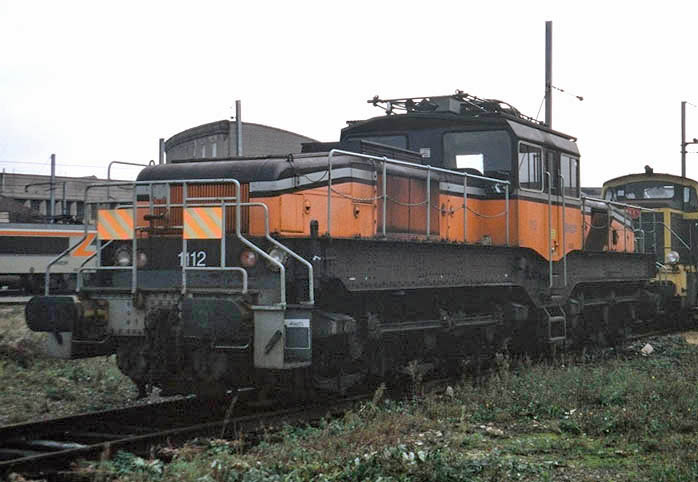
Rebuilt CC 1112 at the Villeneuve-Saint-Georges depot in September 2000.

By the 1980s, the locomotives were getting old and were often immobilized for costly repairs to the rotary converters; this obsolete electrical equipment, intended for 1500 V dc (in practice, of the order of 1350 V in the 1940s) did not adapt well to a line voltage reaching 1700 to 1800 V; and the cab comfort was no longer in line with what drivers had on other, more modern, locomotives. However, no other locomotive then in service was able to replace them and the design and construction of a new series of electric locomotives providing the same services was deemed too expensive. It was therefore decided to modernise them.

Between 1989 and 1995 the class underwent, at the SNCF workshops at Béziers, a major renovation which required several months of immobilization for each locomotive. They were equipped with an enlarged driver's cabin, providing the driver with better visibility on the tracks, better insulation and with a more ergonomic console. New electrical equipment consisting of modern chopper electronics replaced the rotary converters. The brake system was overhauled and radio remote control was installed. They were ballasted to increase their adhesive mass from 91–102 t (90–100 long tons; 100–112 short tons). On completion of the work the locomotives then received the orange and brown livery with grey bands designed by Paul Arzens and reserved for shunting locomotives.

== Career ==
=== Service ===
First numbered by SNCF in the E 1000 series, the two prototype units were initially registered E 1001 and E 1002, they became CC 1100 as part of the general renumbering of the SNCF engine fleet on 1 January 1950.

The main use of the class, throughout their career, was the shunting of freight trains over the hump in marshalling yards. They do not seem to have operated from one yard to another. After their modernisation, they could be remotely controlled from the yard command posts. On the SNCF sectorisation on 1 January 1999, all 12 were allocated to the fleet of prime movers for Fret SNCF.

Despite an in-depth modernisation that could have allowed them to operate past 2010, their withdrawal began in 1998, with locomotives stopped for damage not being repaired. The first to be withdrawn was CC 1109. CC 1110, which was the last to be modernised and remained in service until June 2005 in Toulouse, is now on display at the railway museum in Nîmes.

At the time of their withdrawal, they were the oldest locomotives in the SNCF fleet, having been in service for more than 65 years and the only ones to be, at this date, fitted with coupling rods.

=== Depot allocations ===
Initially the CC 1100s were put into service at the Vierzon, Orléans, Limoges and Tours-Saint-Pierre depots. In 1944, some of the units based in Orléans and Tours-Saint-Pierre were damaged by Allied bombardments but the damage was repairable. In 1981, the allocations were changed: the locomotives moved to the depots of Tours-Saint-Pierre, Toulouse, Villeneuve-Saint-Georges, Lyon-Mouche and Avignon. After their modernisation, the locomotives were gradually deployed to Saint-Jory yard at Toulouse and Villeneuve-Saint-Georges marshalling yard.

== Fleet List ==
number	Entered service	Initial Allocation	Withdrawal	Withdrawn from
CC 1101	3 May 1938	Vierzon	1 August 2003	Villeneuve-Saint-Georges
CC 1102	11 May 1938	Orléans	27 December 2000	Villeneuve-Saint-Georges
CC 1103	19 October 1943	Limoges	28 September 2004	Villeneuve-Saint-Georges
CC 1104	13 January 1944	Orléans	30 June 2005	Toulouse
CC 1105	2 February 1944	Tours-Saint-Pierre	27 December 2000	Villeneuve-Saint-Georges
CC 1106	21 April 1944	Tours-Saint-Pierre	27 December 2000	Villeneuve-Saint-Georges
CC 1107	12 December 1944	Tours-Saint-Pierre	30 June 2005	Toulouse
CC 1108	1 August 1945	Vierzon	30 June 2005	Toulouse
CC 1109	7 September 1945	Orléans	11 December 1998	Toulouse
CC 1110	16 April 1946	Orléans	30 June 2005	Toulouse
CC 1111	8 July 1946	Tours-Saint-Pierre	29 December 2003	Toulouse
CC 1112	13 January 1948	Vierzon	26 January 2004	Villeneuve-Saint-Georges

== Preservation ==
Withdrawn in June 2005 then restored in the SNCF workshops at Béziers, CC 1110 is on display at the Nîmes railway museum.

== Bibliography ==
- Collardey, Bernard (March 1996). "Les Mille-Pattes toujours sur pied !". Rail Passion (in French). No. 8. pp. 8–10.
- Constant, Olivier (2006). "Les locomotives à courant continu 1500 V". Encyclopédie du matériel moteur SNCF : Supplément à la revue « Le Train » (in French). No. 1. Publitrains. ISSN 1267-5008.
- Defrance, Jacques (1978) [1969]. "Le matériel moteur de la SNCF". La Vie du rail (in French).
- Didelot, Frédéric (January–February 2020). "CC 1100, BB 1200, 1300, 1400 : les locomotives de manœuvre conçues par le P.O.". Ferrovissime (in French). No. 103. pp. 30–51. ISSN 1961-5035.
- Fieux, Loïc (October–November 2004). "CC 1100 : derniers coups de bielle pour les mille-pattes des buttes". Correspondances ferroviaires (in French). No. 15. pp. 38–43.
- Knobloch, André; Collardey, Bernard (10 December 1987). "Les mille-pattes vont rajeunir". La Vie du rail (in French). No. 2122. pp. 46–47.
- Redoutey, Denis (2007). Le matériel moteur de la SNCF (in French). Paris: La Vie du rail. ISBN 978-2-915034-65-3. OCLC 470662461.
