= AirClub =

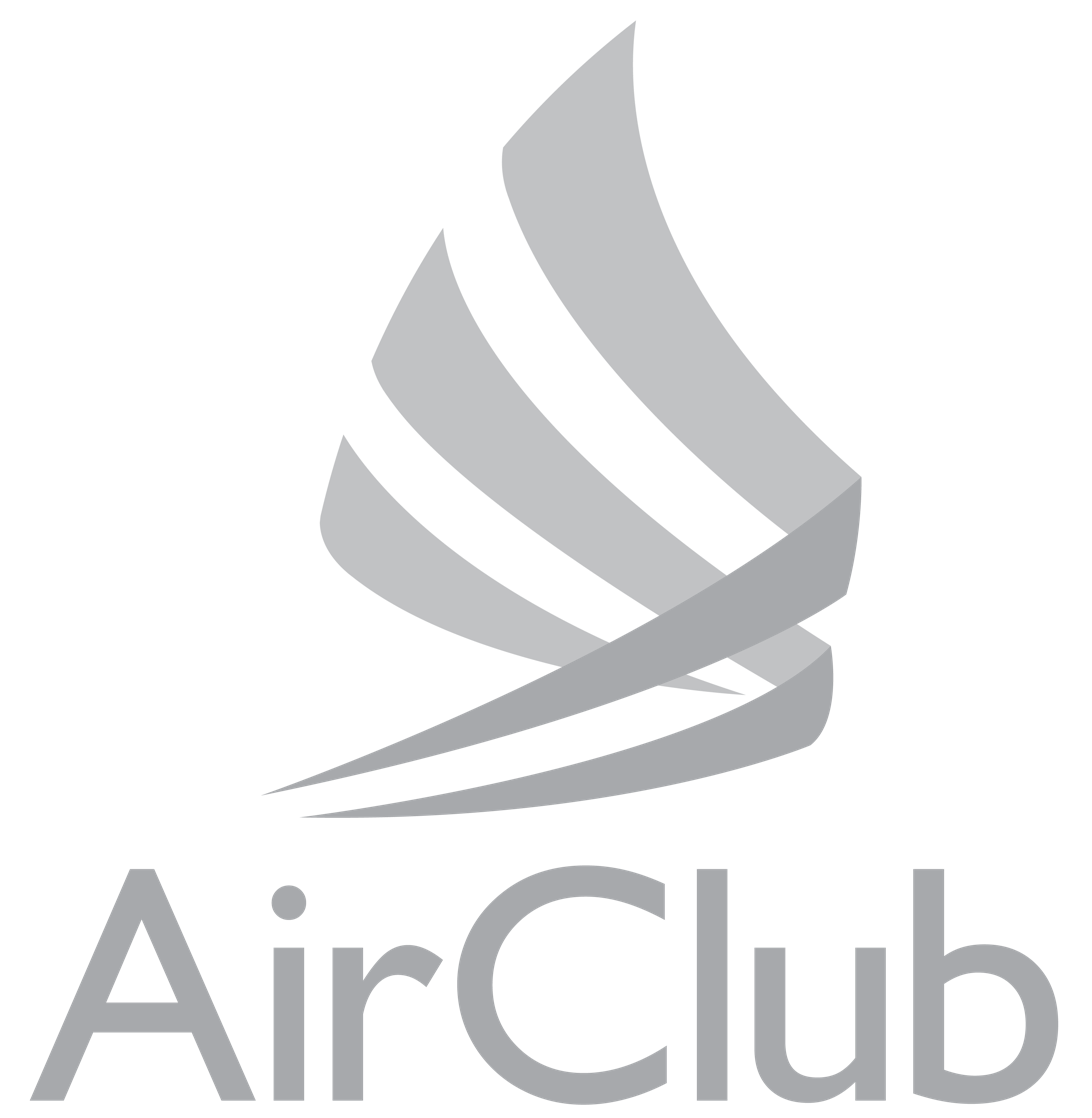
- Launch date: 2012
- Full members: 7
- Fleet size: >100
- Headquarters: Geneva, Switzerland

The AirClub was an airline alliance formed in May 2012. It is considered to be the first and only airline alliance of business airlines, in the world. The alliance has a fleet of over 100 aircraft and is headquartered in Geneva, Switzerland.

== Members ==
As of February 2015, the AirClub has the following members:

Airline	Country	Logo	Joined	Passengers	No. of Aircraft
ACM Air Charter	Germany		2012	N/A	8
Air Alsie	Denmark	Air Alsie's official company logo.	2012	12.000 (2012)	19
Air Hamburg	Germany		2012	N/A	18
FlyingGroup	Belgium		2012	N/A	27
GlobeAir	Austria		2012	6800 (2012)	11
Prime Jet	United States		2014	N/A	11
PrivatAir	Switzerland		2012	>1 Million (in 35 years)	50
