= Equatorial Congo Airlines =

Flag carrier of the Republic of the Congo

Coordinates: 4°16′S 15°17′E

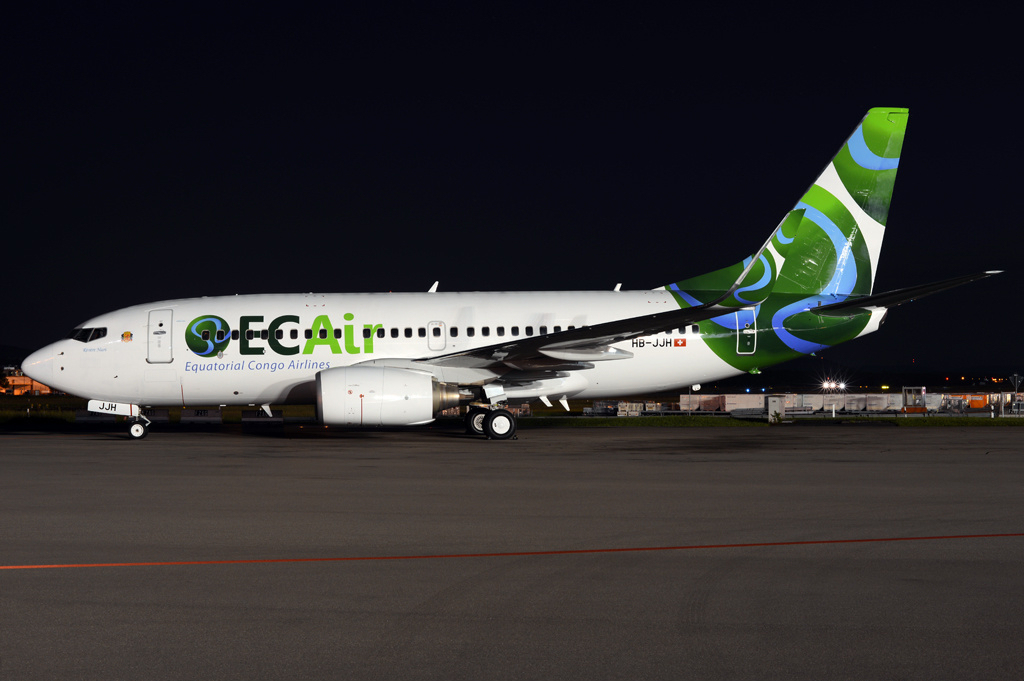
- ECAir Boeing 737-700
IATA	ICAO	Call sign
EJ	EQR	ECAIR
- Founded: March 2011
- Focus cities: Brazzaville and Point Noire
- Fleet size: 1
- Destinations: 6
- Headquarters: Brazzaville, Republic of the Congo
- Key people: Fatima Beyina-Moussa (CEO), Johan Maertens (Deputy CEO), Marco Villa (Director Strategy)
- Website: https://fly-ecair.com/

Equatorial Congo Airlines SA, operating as ECAir, is an airline headquartered in Brazzaville; and is the flag carrier of the Republic of the Congo. The airline suspended all operations on 10 October 2016. However, it restarted operations in late March 2024.

== History ==
ECAir was created with the support of the Congolese Government to serve as a locomotive for the modernization of the aviation sector in the region. Crews and technical support for ECAir were provided by Geneva-based VIP business carrier PrivatAir. In this way, ECAir avoided being included in the list of air carriers banned in the European Union, which applied to all airlines with maintenance services executed in the Republic of the Congo.

Operations commenced on 24 September 2010, the company having taken delivery of its first aircraft, a Boeing 737-300. It took delivery of a second Boeing 737-300 in February 2012. On 24 August 2012, ECAir launched its first international route, Brazzaville – Paris-CDG, offering 4-weekly service on board a PrivatAir Boeing 757 aircraft.

On 14 November 2014, the Belgian airline Jetairfly sealed a wet-lease deal to provide up to four aircraft with crew to operate on behalf of ECAir from mid-2015 on. Widebody operations were launched in February 2015 with the wet-lease of a Boeing 767-300ER from PrivatAir to be used on the Brazzaville to Paris service (4-weekly service). The delivery of a Boeing 787-8 was expected in the first half of 2016, with plans to open new routes to China and the United States.

The airline suspended all operations on 10 October 2016 until further notice after the responsible air navigation provider ceased all services to EC Air over unpaid debts. PrivatAir, which operated several routes on behalf of ECAir, also ended all services for the airline.

ECAir was reportedly looking to restart operations in the first quarter of 2019. In late 2020, plans to scrap some of their planes were also revealed. In early 2023, the government and ECAir revealed their plans to restart operations with 3 B737's and in March 2024, they restarted operations with a single B737 that operates between Brazzaville, Pointe Noire and Ollombo-Oyo. On 2 July 2025, the airline restarted operations to Douala, Yaounde, and Libreville.

== Corporate affairs ==
=== Head office ===
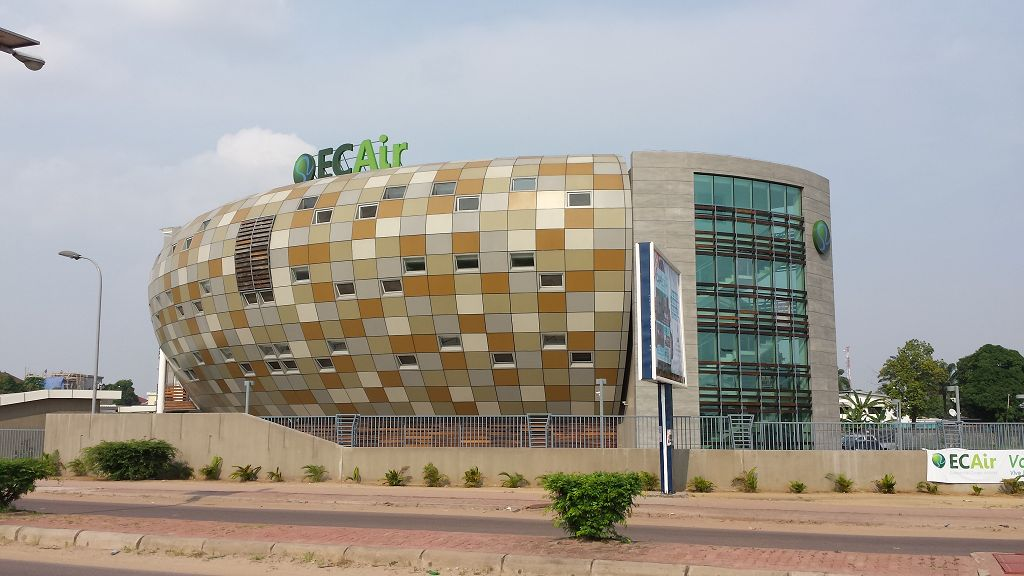
Head office of Equatorial Congo Airlines at Airport Brazzaville

ECAir's corporate headquarters at ECAir House, Maya Maya Airport, Brazzaville.

=== Ownership and structure ===
Since its creation, ECAir had been 70% owned by the Government of the Republic of the Congo, 15% by the seaport of Pointe-Noire and 15% by Heli-Avia company. To launch the airline, the Government engaged Lufthansa Consulting, which managed the complete start-up process preparation, and developed a five-year business plan, including future network and fleet structure for the new airline. From the outset, all cockpit crews and some cabin crews and technical support for ECAir were provided by Geneva-based carrier PrivatAir. After Lufthansa Consulting was phased out, the airline obtained specialised consultancy services mainly via the Swiss company CoeM.

=== Business trends ===
The airline commenced operating in September 2011, and it was reported that the carrier's business plan does not expect it to become profitable until its third year of operation, i.e. 2014. No annual reports have been published, and the main sources for business information are press releases and reports. According to Swiss journalist Marc Renfer in an article published on official media, ECAir lost over 450 million Euros between 2011 and 2016.

	2012	2013	2014	2015
Turnover				
Number of employees	140	260	350	
Number of passengers (000s)		207	360	
Number of aircraft (at year end)	3	4	5	7
Notes/sources				

== Destinations ==
Destination served as of June 2024
Airport	City	Country	IATA	ICAO
Maya-Maya Airport	Brazzaville	Republic of the Congo	BZV	FCBB
Oyo Ollombo Airport	Oyo	Republic of the Congo	OLL	FCOD
Antonio Agostinho Neto International Airport	Pointe-Noire	Republic of the Congo	PNR	FCPP
Douala International Airport	Douala	Cameroon	DLA	FKKD
Yaoundé Nsimalen International Airport	Yaounde	Cameroon	NSI	FKYS
Léon-Mba International Airport	Libreville	Gabon	LBV	FOOL

== Fleet ==
=== Current fleet ===
As of July 2026, Equatorial Congo Airlines operates the following aircraft:

ECAir Fleet
Aircraft	In Fleet	On order	Passengers	Notes
Boeing 737-700	1	–		
Total	1			

=== Former fleet ===
As of August 2025, Equatorial Congo Airlines operated 1 Boeing 737-700

As of June 2024, the ECAir used to operate the following aircraft:

ECAir Fleet
Aircraft	In Fleet	On order	Passengers	Notes
Boeing 737-300	2	–	120	stored
Boeing 737-700	1	–	124	stored
Boeing 757-200	2	–	148	One to be disassembled in Zaventem
Boeing 787-8	–	1	TBD	never delivered; stored in Victorville
Total	5	1		
