= Limberger =

Limberger may refer to:

- A synonym for the grape variety Blaufränkisch

== People with the surname ==
- Carl Limberger (born 1964), Australian tennis player
- Thomas Limberger (born 1967), German businessman

== See also ==
- Limburger cheese
