= Michael Suess =

German manager (born 1963)

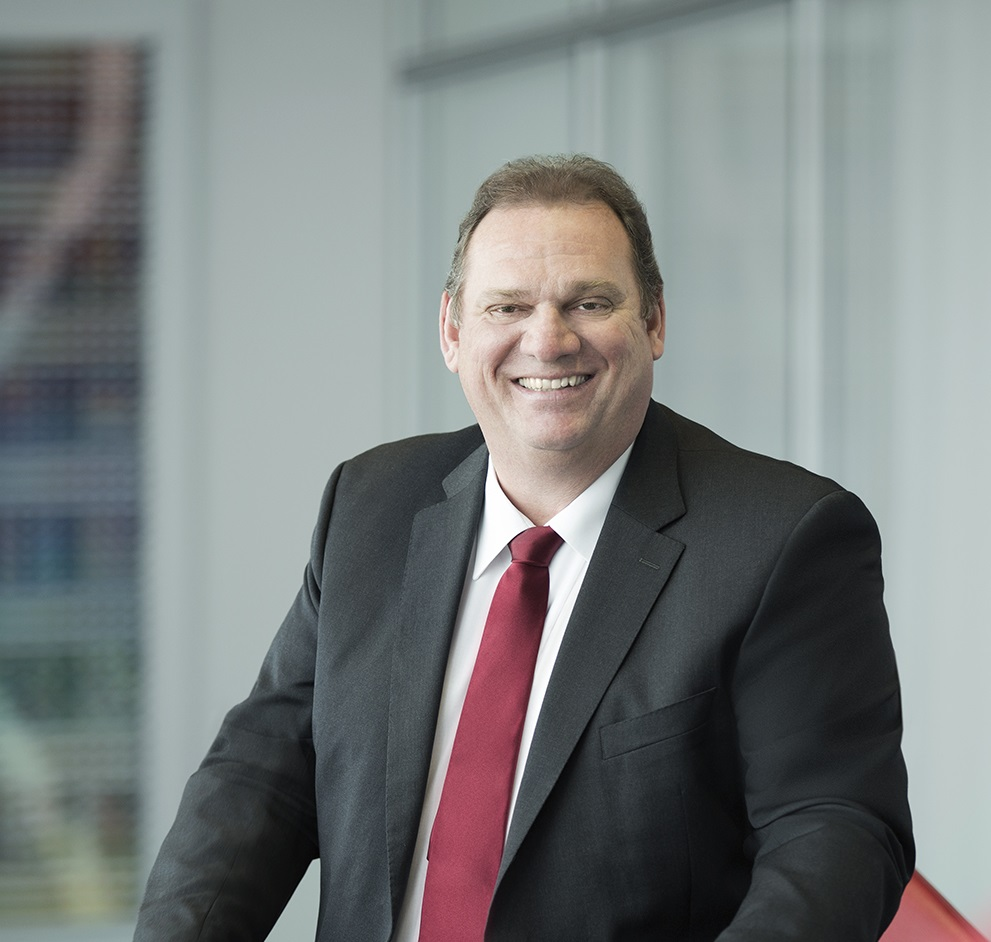
Michael Süß

Michael Suess (Michael Süß; born December 25, 1963, in Munich, West Germany) is a German manager. He is executive chairman of OC Oerlikon, a global technology group listed on the SIX Swiss Exchange, and first deputy chairman of the supervisory board of the Austrian electricity company, Verbund AG. From 2015 to 2016, he was CEO of the GMH Group.

== Career ==
Suess studied mechanical engineering at the Technical University of Munich and gained his first work experience as a technician at the BMW foundry while studying. After graduation, he began his professional career in 1989 as a production engineer at BMW in Munich. In 1991, he became Head of Planning Department in the factory business. In 1994, he received his doctorate (Dr. rer. pol.) from the Institute for Industrial Engineering and Ergonomics at the University of Kassel, Germany.

After serving in various positions at BMW, IDRA Press S.p.A. in Italy and Porsche AG, Suess was appointed to the Managing Board of Mössner AG in Munich in 1999. Following the takeover of the company by the Georg-Fischer Group, Suess was named Chairman of the Managing Board of GF Mössner GmbH.

In 2001, he took on the role as Chief Operating Officer at MTU Aero Engines GmbH in Munich and was responsible for production, development and procurement. Following the initial public listing of the company, Suess joined the Managing Board of MTU Aero Engines Holding AG and was responsible for the company’s technology portfolio.

Suess then joined Siemens AG in 2006 as the President of the company’s Power Generation Group. He was appointed CEO of the Fossil Power Generation Division at the beginning of 2008, responsible for the fossil power plant business. From April 2011 to May 2014, he was a member of the Managing Board of Siemens AG and CEO of the company’s Energy Sector. As CEO of Siemens’ Energy Sector, Michael Suess was actively engaged in discussions on how to achieve a secure, sustainable and, above all, affordable energy transition in Germany.

Since 2010, Suess has been holding a supervisory Board position at Herrenknecht AG, a world market leader of tunnel drilling rigs in Germany. From 2015 to 2016, Suess served as CEO of the GMH Group, a privately owned group of steel and casting companies in Germany. Suess currently serves as the Executive Chairman of OC Oerlikon, headquartered in Switzerland, and as First Deputy Chairman of the supervisory board of the Austrian Electricity Company Verbund AG.

Suess has been a guest lecturer at the Technical University of Munich since 2013, from which he was awarded an honorary professorship in 2015.

== Memberships and functions ==
Suess was and is a member of various management and advisory boards, including:

- Arabia Electric Ltd. (Equipment) (AR 2010–2011)
- Arabia Electric Ltd. (Equipment) (AR 2014–2014)
- AREVA NP S.A.S. (AR 2008–2009)
- German Atomic Forum e.V. (President 2008–2011)
- German Atomic Forum e.V. (Financial committee 2008–2011)
- German-Russian Forum e.V. (Board of trustees 2012–2013)
- Georgsmarienhütte Holding GmbH (AR 2014–2014)
- Herrenknecht AG (AR 2010-today)
- ISCOSA Industries and Maintenance Ltd. (AR 2008–2009)
- KION Group GmbH (AR 2009–2012)
- KION Holding 1 GmbH (AR 2009–2012)
- OAO Power Machines (AR 2007–2011)
- OC Oerlikon AG (Chairman of the Board of Directors 2015–July 30, 2022; Executive Chairman July 1, 2022–today)
- OOO Siemens (AR 2007–2009)
- Committee of the Eastern German economy (President 2012–2013)
- Renova AG (Portfolio Manager 2015-today)
- Siemens Corporation (AR 2013–2014)
- Siemens Energy Inc. (AR 2005–2011)
- Siemens Limited (AR 2008–2011)
- Siemens Limited (AR 2014–2014)
- Siemens S.A., Morocco (AR 2006–2009)
- Siemens S.A., Tunisia (AR 2007–2008)
- Siemens spa (AR 2007–2008)
- Siemens (Proprietary) Limited (AR 2007–2009)
- Siemens W.L.L.(AR 2013–2014)
- VA TECH T & D Co. Ltd. (AR 2009–2011)
- VA TECH T & D Co. Ltd. (AR 2014–2014)
- Verbund AG (First Deputy Chairman AR 2015-today)
- World energy council Germany (President 2008-today)

== Personal life ==
Michael Suess is married and has four children.
