= Limberg Castle =

- Preußisch Oldendorf-Börninghausen
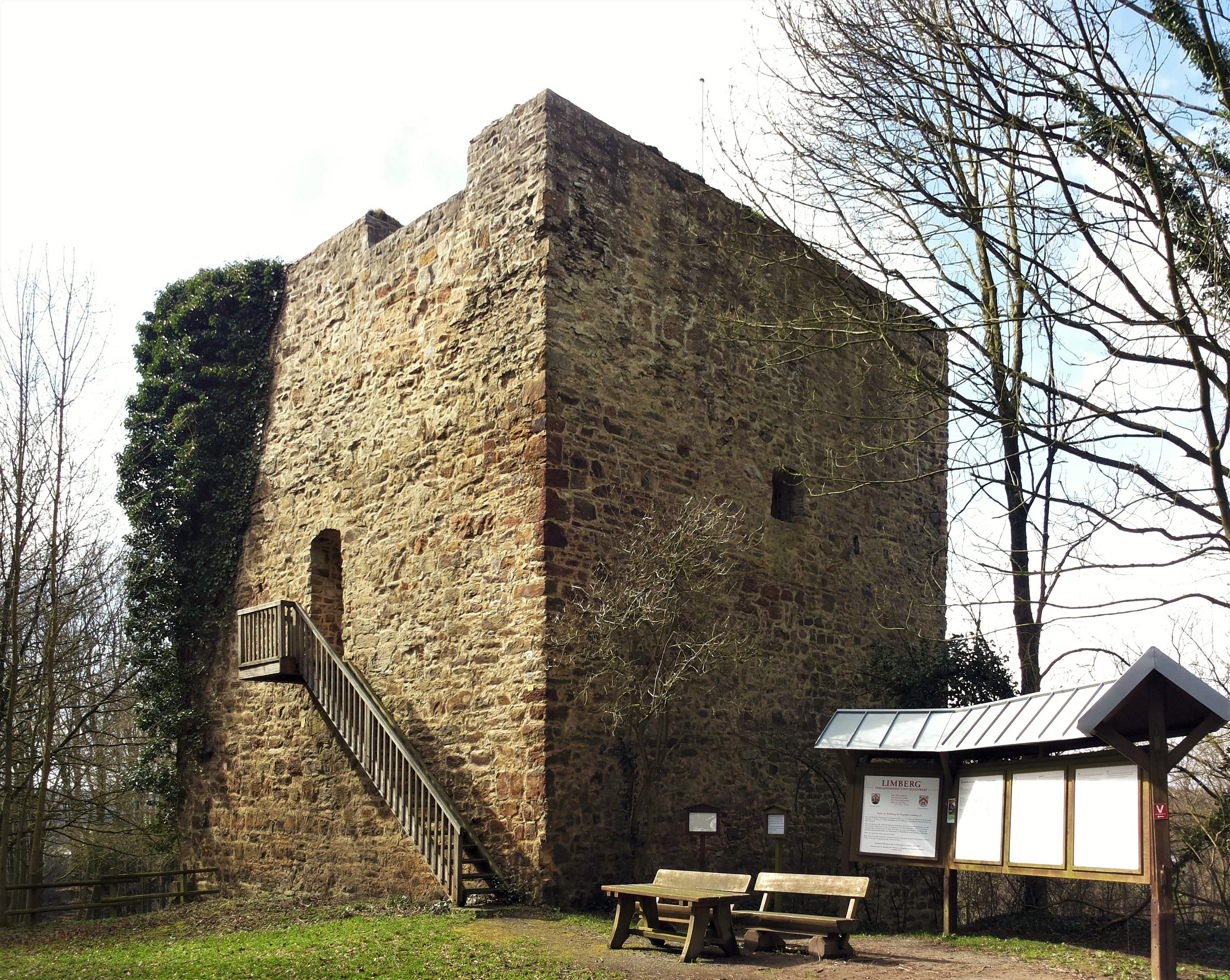
- The ruins on the Limberg

Site information
- Type: hill castle
- Code: DE-NW
- Condition: bergfried, wall remains and banks

Location
- Coordinates: 52°16′49″N 8°30′30″E
- Height: 190 m above sea level (NN)

Site history
- Built: 13th century

Limberg Castle (German: Burg Limberg) is a ruined hill castle on the 190-metre-high Limberg in the Wiehen Hills. It is located near the village of Börninghausen in the borough of Preußisch Oldendorf in the East Westphalian county of Minden-Lübbecke in the German state of North Rhine-Westphalia.

== History ==
The castle was built in the 13th century at a strategic site on the border of the bishoprics of Minden and Osnabrück, probably by the Bishop of Minden. Even before that, a castle or fortress was said to have stood on the site, at which Duke Widukind stayed. Around 1300, the castle became the possession of the counts of Ravensberg as a fief and was extended by them. The castle is first recorded in a document in 1319. On the death of the last Count of Ravensberg, Bernard in 1346, the Limberg, as part of the County of Ravensberg, fell to the later Duke of Jülich and Berg. In 1554, Limberg Castle was damaged by fire but restored. As a result of the War of the Jülich Succession, the castle was allocated in the 1614 Treaty of Xanten to the Elector of Brandenburg, who - after it had been captured and held during the Thirty Years' War by the Count Palatine of Neuburg, had it manned with a small contingent after 1647. During the war, it had been guarded by a 30-man garrison which was meant to guarantee the integrity of the castle, but when they were detailed to support the siege of Lippstadt, it was not difficult for the Count Palatine to seize it. In 1662, the castle's garrison of twenty men was transferred to the Sparrenburg, thus ending its history as a military base. Regardless of its overlord, the castle was always in the charge of various vassal lords (Pfandherren) or bailiffs (Amtmänner or Droste). Towards the end of the 17th century, the castle gradually deteriorated and was barely usable for military purposes. In 1695, in a rescript by Elector Frederick I of Prussia to the Ravensberg bailiwick (Amtskammer), it was recommended that the house of Limberg be demolished since, due to its state of disrepair, it had become uninhabitable. In the text, it was said that Limberg House "which, due to its decrepitude, no one could live in, was to be demolished, it being not the least use to the people and the country, because it was not situated on any pass, but in times of war could only be used by the enemy as a thieve's den." The tower was still used as a gaol until 1805 and was finally sold in 1832. In the 1980s, an association was founded to preserve the castle ruins.

== Description ==
The square twelve-metre-high bergfried (tower house), with sides measuring twelve metres long, was restored in 1989 and may be visited. In addition there are also several defensive banks, the wall remains of the palas and parts of the enceinte as well as the moat. At the castle is a 600-year-old "court lime" (Gogerichtslinde), which used to act as the site of a regional magistracy or Gogericht.

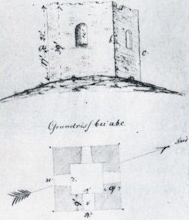
1850 sketch of the ruins

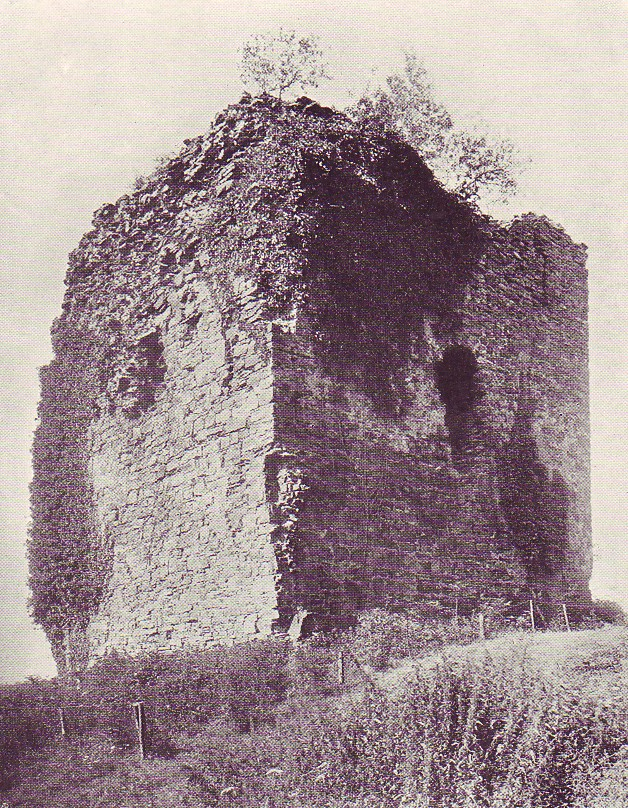
The ruins in 1905

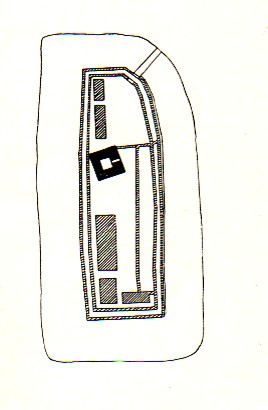
Floor plan of the Limburg in 1907

== Literature ==
- Bernhard Brönner: Die Burg Limberg und ihre Geschichte in kurzem Abriß. Preußisch Oldendorf, 1950.
- Gustav Engel: Die Ravensbergischen Landesburgen. U. Helmichs Buchhandlung, Bielefeld, 1934, ISBN 3-89534-093-6.
- Gustav Engel: Landesburg und Landesherrschaft an Osning, Wiehen und Weser. Pfeffersche Buchhandlung, Bielefeld, 1979, ISBN 3-88024-028-0.
- Verein zur Erhaltung der Burgruine Limberg e. V. (publ.): Die Burg Limberg – Mittelpunkt einer Region. Beiträge zur Geschichte und Gegenwart. Selbstverlag, Preußisch Oldendorf, 2007, ISBN 978-3-00-022386-0.
- Edgar F. Warnecke: Das große Buch der Burgen und Schlösser im Land von Hase und Ems. 2nd edition. H. Th. Wenner, Osnabruck, 1985, ISBN 3-87898-297-6.
