= Fatima Beyina-Moussa =

Congolese business executive

CEO of ECAir (2011 to date), Chairwoman of the African Education Foundation (2011 to date), Chairwoman of the AISB Board of Directors

Personal details
- Born: 31 March 1973 (age 53) Dakar, Senegal
- Spouse: Bel-Gaza Beyina
- Children: Besylan Beyina, Haymon Beyina
- Parents: Pierre Moussa (father); Aissata Moussa née Traoré (mother)
- Relatives: Binta Moussa, Jessica Moussa, François Moussa
- Education: HEC Montréal - University of Ottawa - Sciences Po - Harvard University
- Occupation: CEO of ECAir (2011 to present) and Chairwoman of the African Education Foundation (2011 to present)
- Website: https://www.fatimabeyinamoussa.com/
- Nickname: FBM

Fatima Beyina-Moussa (born March 31, 1973) is a Congolese business executive and a political figure. She is the chairwoman of the African Foundation for Education (FAE) and was elected to the Brazzaville City Council in July 2022.

Since the establishment of ECAir in 2011, she has been leading the flag carrier of the Republic of the Congo. In late 2014, she became the first woman elected as President of the African Airlines Association (AFRAA).

== Family background ==
Born in Dakar, Fatima Beyina-Moussa is the eldest of four children of a Malian mother, Aissata TRAORE, and a Congolese father, Pierre MOUSSA.

Her father, Pierre MOUSSA, is the current secretary general of the Congolese Labour Party (PCT). He was the president of the CEMAC Commission from 2012 to 2017 and has held various ministerial positions in Congolese governments from 1979 to 2012.

Her mother, Aissata MOUSSA, née Traoré, is an insurance specialist who served as Director of Reinsurance at the Société Nationale d’Assurances du Congo (ARC) and co-founded the General Insurance Company of Congo (AGC) in 2000. She held various leadership roles within AGC before retiring in 2013 and also served as President of the Board of Ecobank Congo and Governor of Lions Club District 403B.

== Early life and secondary education ==
Fatima began her education at La Poste Primary School in Brazzaville and continued at Collège Mafoua Virgile in Brazzaville. In the fourth grade, her parents sent her to the European International School in Paris (Draveil, France). She completed her secondary education at Lycée Notre-Dame des Oiseaux (Verneuil-sur-Seine), where she graduated with a Bachelor’s degree (Economic Series) with honors.

== Higher education ==
Fatima holds a Bachelor of Business Administration (Finance) from HEC Montreal, an MBA from the University of Ottawa, and a DEA (Advanced Studies Diploma) in Economics from Sciences Po Paris. She has also participated in professional trainings, including at Harvard University’s Kennedy School of Government (Boston) and the IMF headquarters in Washington, DC.

== Professional career ==
Fatima began her career as a financial auditor with the international firm Ernst & Young. She was recruited in Paris and sent to their office in Pointe-Noire, Congo.

=== BEAC ===
At BEAC's National Directorate for the Congo, she was head of the Money Market Department and then head of the Balance of Payments and External Financial Relations Department. It was at BEAC that Fatima met her future husband, the Central African economist Bel-Gaza BEYINA.

=== UNDP Economist - New York Office ===
After BEAC, Fatima and her husband moved to New York, where she joined the United Nations Development Programme (UNDP) as an economist in the Special Unit for South-South Cooperation. In this role, she worked on documents related to the Least Developed Countries during the second committee of the UN General Assembly.

=== Program manager - Innovation Fund ===
After New York, Fatima follows her husband to Lagos, Nigeria, where he has just been recruited by the United Bank for Africa (UBA) as director of their expansion in Francophone Africa. There, she is hired as the manager of an Innovation Fund at EFInA (Enhancing Financial Innovation and Access), a project of the British development agency (DFID, Department for International Development).

EFInA aims to increase financial inclusion in Nigeria, and the Innovation Fund managed by Fatima funded small projects that had a positive impact on improving Nigerian people's access to financial services.

=== Advisor to the Ministry of Finance of Congo ===
Upon her return to Congo after her stay in Nigeria, Fatima Beyina-Moussa was hired in early 2010 as an Economic and Reform Advisor to the Minister of Finance, Economy, and Budget.

=== Director General of ECAir ===
After leading the creation of the national airline, ECAir, Fatima Beyina-Moussa became its first General Manager in 2011.

In November 2014, Fatima Beyina-Moussa was elected President of the African Airlines Association (AFRAA) for the year 2015, becoming the first woman to hold this position. She chaired the annual AFRAA General Assembly in Brazzaville in November 2015. The company faced financial challenges and temporarily suspended its flight operations.

== Social and Community Involvement ==
In 2011, she put her commitment into practice by founding the African Foundation for Education (FAE), which would lead to the creation of the American International School of Brazzaville (AISB) in August 2012. Fatima is the founding president of both FAE and AISB, where she also serves as the chairman of the board of directors.

=== Creation of the African Foundation for Education ===
The FAE has developed several programmes of educational excellence in the Congo and the sub-region.

Fatima has led the establishment of partnerships between FAE and the Tony Elumelu Foundation, as well as with the BEM Africa group, with which FAE has just created BEM Management School Brazzaville, the first international business school in the Congo.

Since its creation, the FAE has been the Congo partner of HEC Montréal.

=== Creation of the American International School of Brazzaville ===
The American International School of Brazzaville (AISB) was established in 2013.

The school accommodates over 100 students from kindergarten to secondary levels. AISB is the first school in Congo accredited by the Middle States Association (MSA) and the International Baccalaureate (IB), ensuring the quality and recognition of its academic programs.

=== Launch of EsMBA with HEC Montreal ===
Since its establishment in 2011, FAE has formed a solid partnership with HEC Montreal, Fatima’s alma mater. This partnership, based on strong ties and a shared vision of educational excellence, has led to several training programs for executives in Congo and the region.

=== Creation of BEM Brazzaville ===
BEM Brazzaville is a business school located in Brazzaville, Congo, and is part of the BEM (Bordeaux School of Management) network, which has established a strong presence in Africa. BEM is also present in Dakar, Abidjan, and Douala.

BEM Brazzaville offers a range of academic programs, including bachelor's, master's, and continuing education in fields such as management, finance, marketing, and entrepreneurship.

BEM Brazzaville is the result of a collaboration between KEDGE-BEM and FAE through its training institution, the Institut Supérieur de Technologie et de Gestion (ISTEG). Fatima Beyina-Moussa is a member of BEM Brazzaville’s board of directors.

== Political career ==
As a member of the central committee of the Congolese Labour Party (PCT), she was elected to the Brazzaville City Council. Fatima BEYINA-MOUSSA has been secretary for economic, environmental and sustainable development issues on the Poto-Poto PCT committee since 2020. She is a member of the Brazzaville City Council.

== Personal life ==
Fatima Beyina-Moussa is married to Central African economist Bel-Gaza BEYINA. The couple resides in Brazzaville with their two children.
