= Limberg (Wiehen Hills) =

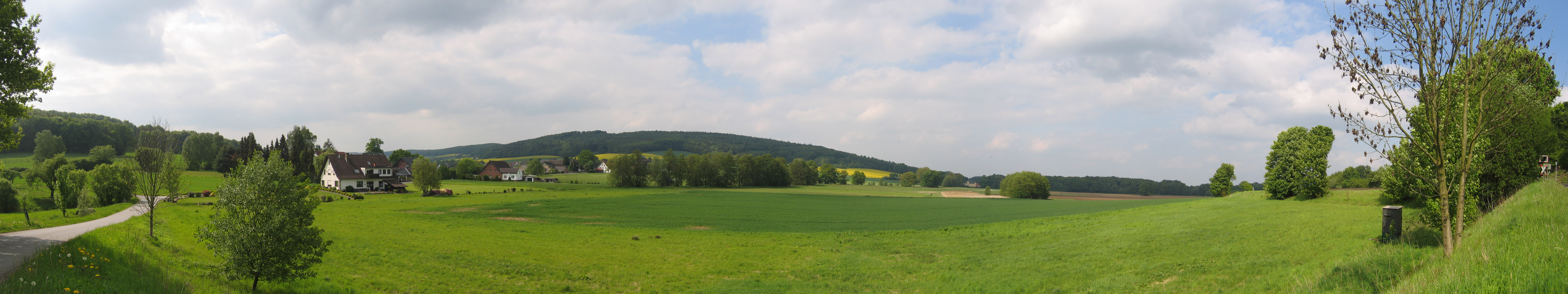
- View of the Limberg from the SE

Highest point
- Elevation: 190 m above sea level (NN) (620 ft)
- Listing: Ruins of Limberg Castle
- Coordinates: 52°16′49″N 8°30′30″E

Geography
- Location within North Rhine-Westphalia
- Location: North Rhine-Westphalia, Germany
- Parent range: Wiehen Hills

Geology
- Rock type: Sandstone

The Limberg is a hill in the Egge, a side ridge of the Wiehen Hills, south of Preußisch Oldendorf in the German state of North Rhine-Westphalia. The ruins of Limberg Castle are located on the hillside.

== Limberg Hill ==
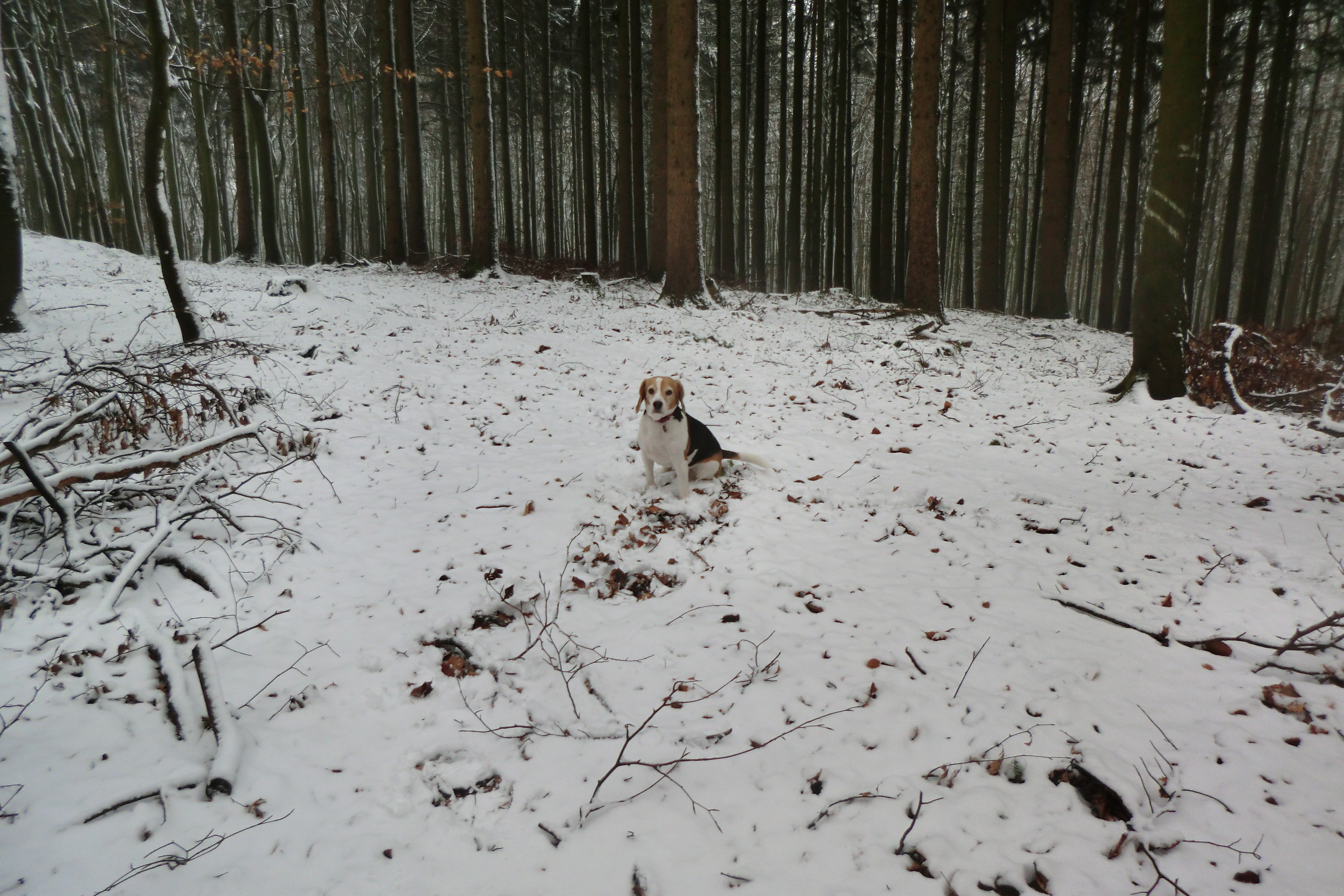
The summit of the Limberg itself is unspectacular, offers no views and no paths lead to it. The summit point is marked in the photograph by the dog

The name Limberg is probably derived from the term liet ("gentle hill"), but it may also refer to lime trees. The Limberg is about 190 metres high and rises roughly north of the main crest of the Wiehen Hills, southwest of Bad Holzhausen. Opposite it, on the main ridge, is the Maschberg, also 190 metres high. The Limberg and its western spur, its link to the Maschberg and Nonnenstein, another hill on the main chain, southwest of the Limberg, form the valley of Eggetal.

== Limberg Castle ==
The twelve-metre-high bergfried of the castle was restored around 1989 and may be visited. Otherwise there are still a few wall remains and banks visible. At the castle is a 600-year-old Gogericht lime tree, which used to be the site of a regional court.

== Literature ==
- Bernhard Brönner: Die Burg Limberg und ihre Geschichte in kurzem Abriß. Preußisch Oldendorf, 1950.
- Gustav Engel: Die Ravensbergischen Landesburgen. U. Helmichs Buchhandlung, Bielefeld 1934, ISBN 3-89534-093-6.
- Gustav Engel: Landesburg und Landesherrschaft an Osning, Wiehen und Weser. Pfeffersche Buchhandlung, Bielefeld, 1979, ISBN 3-88024-028-0.
- Verein zur Erhaltung der Burgruine Limberg e. V. (publ.): Die Burg Limberg – Mittelpunkt einer Region. Beiträge zur Geschichte und Gegenwart. Selbstverlag, Preußisch Oldendorf, 2007, ISBN 978-3-00-022386-0.
