= Thomas Limberger =

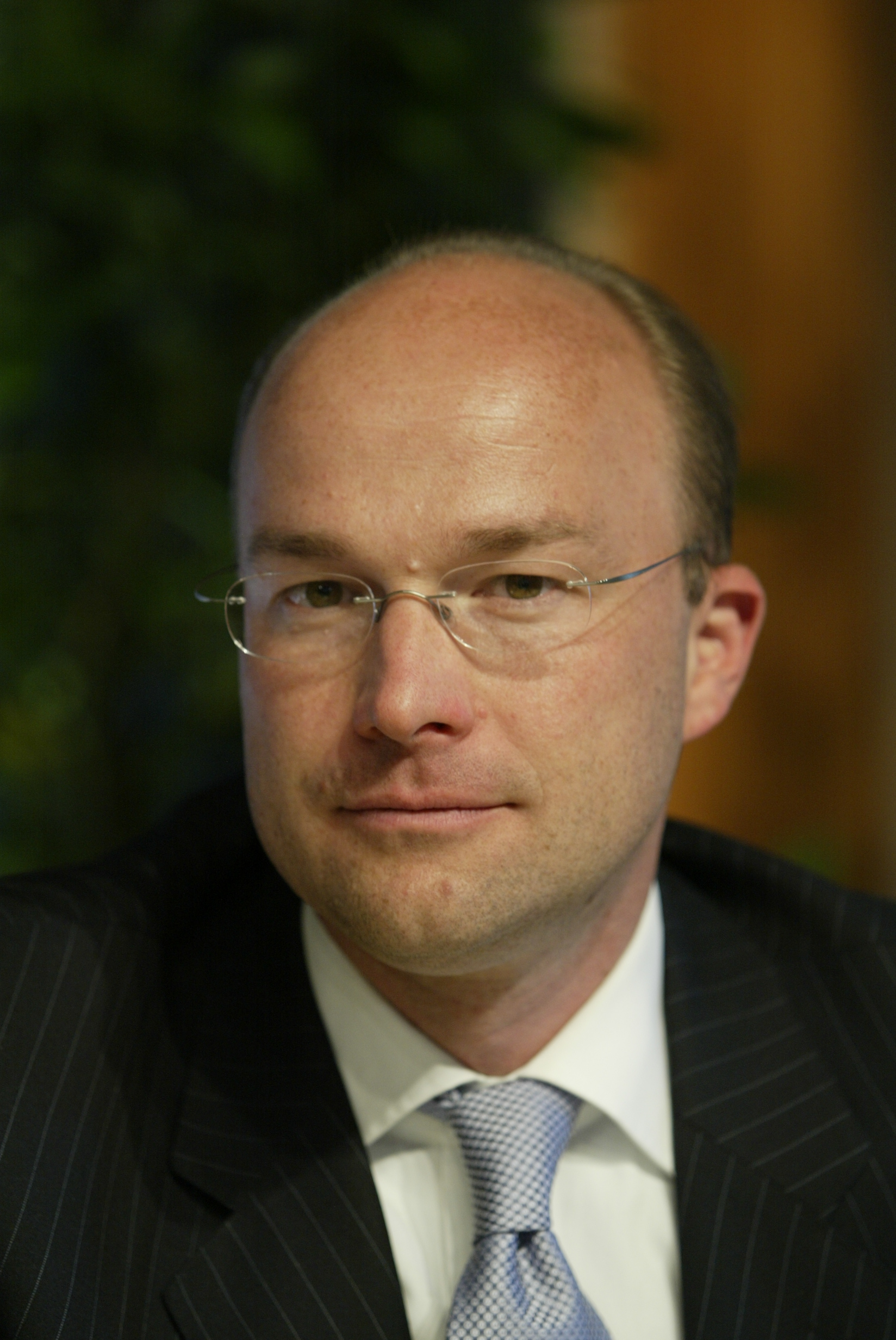
- Limberger in 2005
- Born: 22 July 1967 (age 59); Bad Homburg vor der Höhe, Germany
- Citizenship: German, USA
- Education: Institut Superieur de Gestion, Harvard Business School
- Occupations: Industrial manager, restructuring expert, and investor
- Children: 3
- Website: http://www.silverarrowcapital.com/

Thomas Peter Limberger (born 22 July 1967) is a German-American industrial manager, restructuring expert, and investor. He is the founder of investment company, SilverArrow Capital. He previously was the CEO of General Electric Western Europe, Oerlikon AG, Von Roll AG.

== Early life and education ==
Limberger holds a Bachelor of Science and Business Administration (B.S.B.A.) from The American Business School and an MBA from Institut Supérieur De Gestion. Limberger later completed the Owner/President Management Program (OPM) at Harvard Business School.

== Career ==
=== Fresenius Medical Care ===
In 1996, National Medical Care was acquired, forming Fresenius Medical Care based in Bad Homburg vor der Höhe, Germany. Limberger joined the company in 1996, holding various management roles until 2001.

=== General Electric ===
In January 2001, Limberger took a position at General Electric, responsible for the German Industrial business division. In 2002, he became CEO of General Electric Germany, Austria and Switzerland (Central Europe). In this role he was responsible for all General Electric’s activities in Central Europe with 11,000 employees. It was under his management, that the region’s revenues doubled to $6.5 billion and earnings tripled.

He was also at the helm during the integration of Allbank, where he was chairman until 2005, and the building of a Global GE Research Facility on the Technical University of Munich campus.

=== OC Oerlikon ===
In May 2004, Limberger was elected to the board of OC Oerlikon. One year later, after insolvency and a change in key shareholders, he became CEO and Vice President of the board. He centralized management, restructured the 7 industrial business units. He led the company from a loss of 340 million Swiss Francs in 2004 to a record profit of 320 million Swiss Francs in 2006. Due to these efforts and the surge in the Oerlikon share price, the company won the Dow Jones EUROSTOXX 500 prize for the best stock in Europe.

=== Von Roll ===
From 2007 until 2011, Limberger was president and CEO of Von Roll, a manufacturer of insulation products and systems for the electrical machinery industry as well as for composite materials and parts for various industrial applications. Limberger successfully turned the company into a market leader in the industry with a sales growth of 33% and an EBIT growth of 103% (CAGR 2006-2008). The share price of the company increased fivefold during this period.

=== SilverArrow Capital ===
In 2011, Limberger founded SilverArrow Capital, an investment company focusing on industrial growth sectors, real estate and infrastructure projects. With a deal flow of over $16 billion, Limberger has established himself as one of the leading activist players in the industry. It generated a 24% return in 2014 and a 19% return in 2016. In November 2015, it announced plans to raise its stake in Rofin-Sinar to 15% to force the company to appoint three new independent directors. In March 2016, the company announced that it would be acquired, leading to a surge in the share price.

In October 2016, it acquired 51% of PrivatAir, a Swiss airline. PrivatAir became insolvent in December 2018.

In 2021, Limberger was investigated by German prosecutors in connection with COVID-19 mask procurement deals involving former CSU politicians Georg Nüßlein and Alfred Sauter. The Higher Regional Court of Munich subsequently lifted an arrest warrant and asset seizure against Limberger, finding that the conduct under investigation did not constitute bribery of elected officials under the applicable version of German law.

== Awards and recognition ==
Limberger was named a “World Young Leader” by the Herbert Quandt BMW Foundation.

== Board Memberships and Affiliations ==
Limberger is the president of the World Economic Council, a global NGO headquartered in Vienna. He is a member of the World Economic Forum in Davos, the Clinton Global Initiative, and the Executive Board of Project Hope. He also serves on the boards of organizations such as SGS S.A., Mövenpick AG, Unaxis AG, Deutsche Venture Capital GmbH, and Allgemeine Privatkundenbank (later GE Money Bank).
