= Aero-Dienst =

German charter airline

IATA	ICAO	Call sign
-	ADN	AERODIENST
- Founded: 1958
- Fleet size: 13
- Destinations: charter
- Headquarters: Nuremberg, Germany
- Key people: Viktor Peters (CEO)
- Website: aero-dienst.de

Aero-Dienst GmbH & Co. KG is a German charter airline operating business jet and air ambulance flights out of Nuremberg Airport.

== History ==
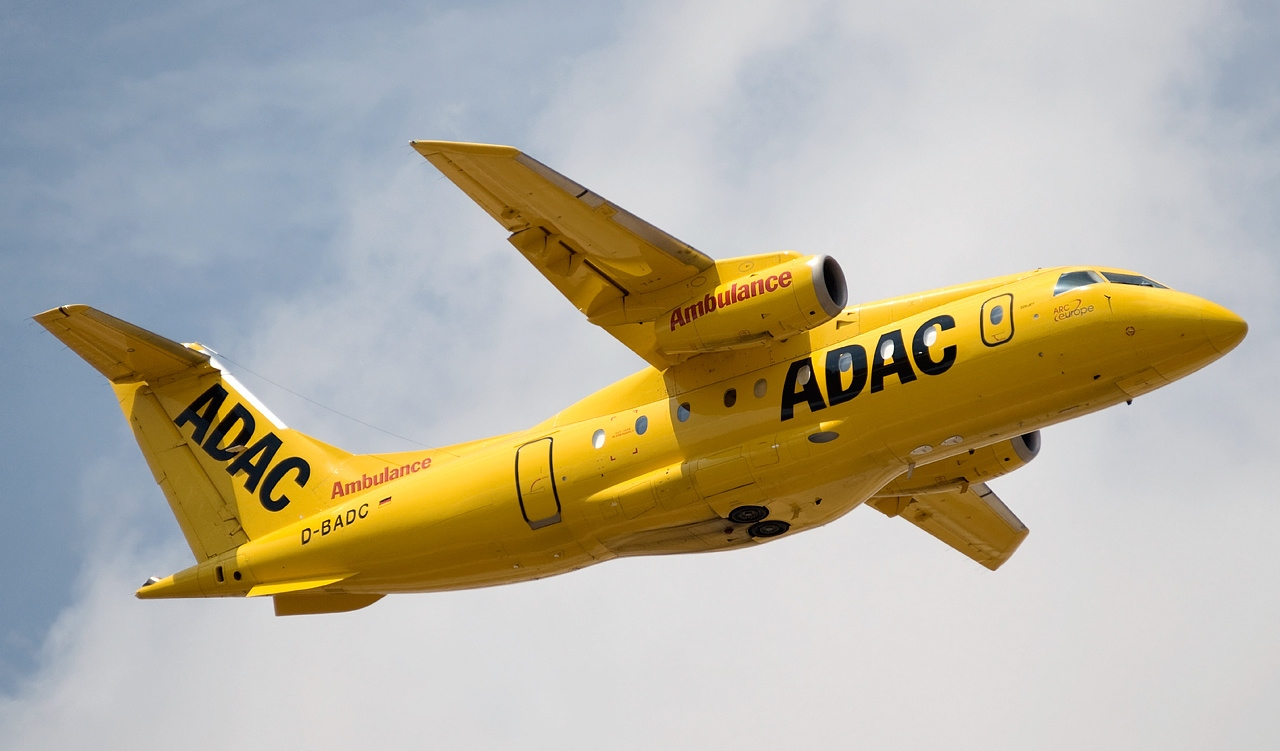
Aero-Dienst Dornier 328JET in ADAC livery

The company was founded in 1958 by the companies "Diehl" and "Faun", initially operating several jet and propeller aircraft and helicopters. Since 1998, Aero-Dienst has operated air ambulance services on behalf of ADAC. It is one of the oldest commercial airlines in Germany that still operates under its original name.

== Fleet ==
As of November 2018, Aero-Dienst operates the following aircraft for its charter and ambulance services:

- 1 Beechcraft King Air 350
- 1 Bombardier Challenger 300
- 1 Bombardier Challenger 604
- 2 Dornier 328JET (as of July 2026)
- 1 Learjet 45
- 2 Learjet 60

== Accidents and incidents ==
- On 7 June 1993, an Aero-Dienst Learjet 35A (registered D-COCO) crashed shortly after takeoff from Cologne Bonn Airport on a chartered flight to Nuremberg, killing the two passengers and two crew members on board.
