= OC Oerlikon =

Swiss engineering company

OC Oerlikon Corporation AG

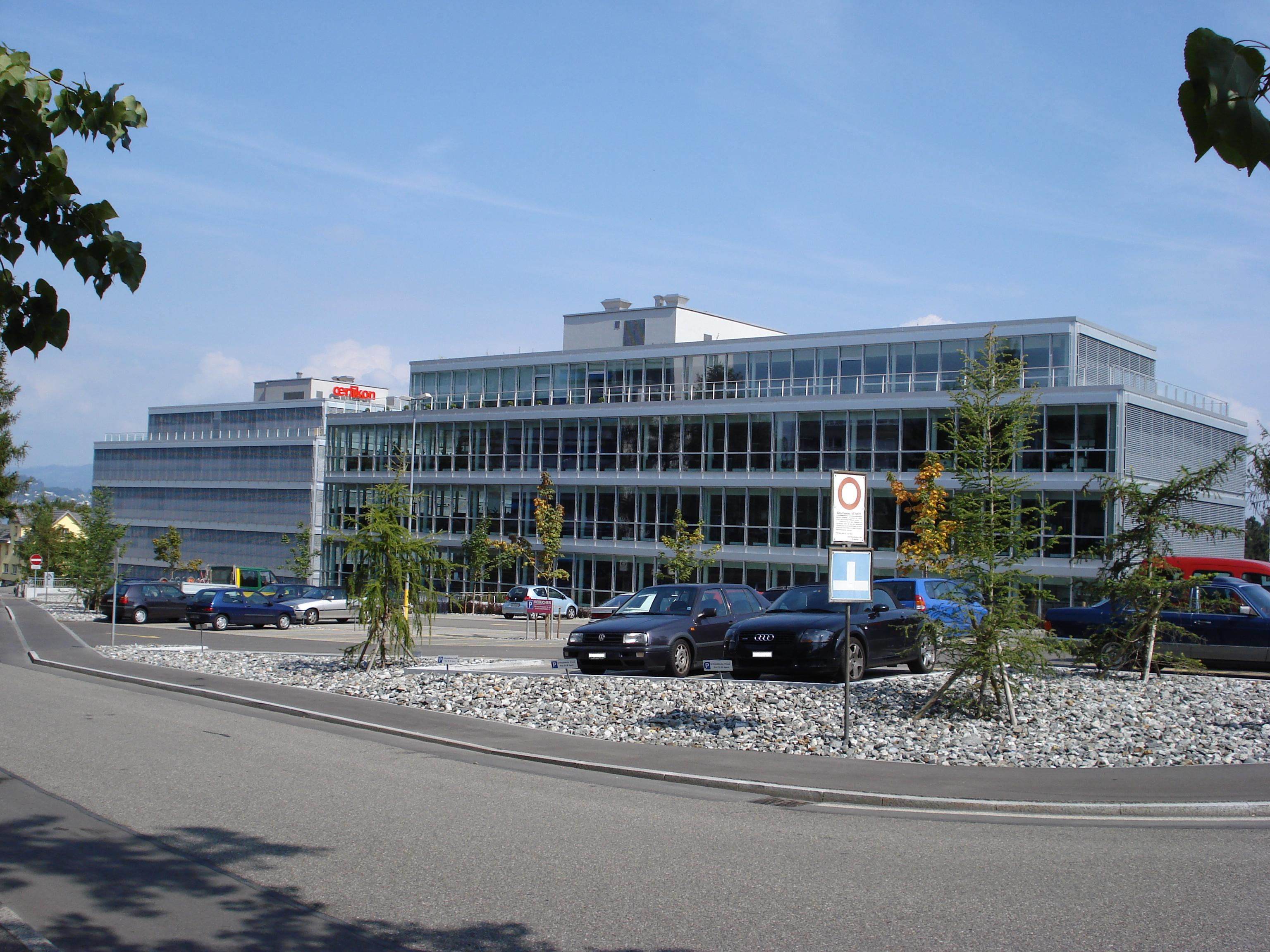
- Headquarters in Pfäffikon
- Type: Public
- Traded as: SIX: OERL
- ISIN: CH0000816824
- Industry: engineering / construction
- Founded: 1973 / 2000 / 2006
- Headquarters: Pfäffikon, Schwyz, Switzerland
- Key people: Michael Süss (Executive Chairman)
- Revenue: SFr 1.6 billion (2025)
- Number of employees: ~10,000 (2026)
- Website: www.oerlikon.com/en/

OC Oerlikon is a listed technology group headquartered in Pfäffikon (Schwyz), Switzerland. The name "Oerlikon" (or "œrlikon", as the company styles itself according to its corporate identity) comes from the Oerlikon district in Zurich where the group has its origins.

The roots of today's OC Oerlikon are to be found in Maschinenfabrik Oerlikon, which was established in 1876 and evolved into Oerlikon-Bührle Holding in 1973. Following an extensive restructuring process, the holding was renamed Unaxis at the start of 2000. The Austrian Victory Industriebeteiligung AG acquired a majority share in Unaxis in 2005. New management initiated a restructuring effort that manifested itself in a new name – OC Oerlikon – from the beginning of September 2005. At the end of 2006, the Saurer Group was acquired and integrated into OC Oerlikon. As of today, a position of around 41% is held by Liwet Holding AG, of which Victor Vekselberg is one of the beneficial owners.

== Corporate affairs ==
=== Corporate structure ===
OC Oerlikon used to have two Divisions:

- Surface Solutions Division (Oerlikon Balzers, Oerlikon Metco and Oerlikon AM)
- Polymer Processing Division (Oerlikon Barmag, Oerlikon Neumag and Oerlikon Nonwoven)

The Polymer Processing Division has been divested and currently the Oerlikon is a pure player in the Surface Solution market

The following divisions of the Oerlikon Components business unit, which were designated as not in line with the company's core business, were divested in 2009: Oerlikon Esec (semiconductors) was sold in April 2009 to the Dutch company BE Semiconductor Industries (Besi), and Oerlikon Space (aerospace engineering) was sold off in June 2009 to RUAG Holding. The last remaining company in the Oerlikon Optics business unit (optics) – Oerlikon Optics Shanghai – was sold off in mid-August 2009 to the British company EIS Optics, which had been newly set up by the London-based private equity firms Nova Capital Management Limited and FF&P Private Equity Limited. Since that time, Oerlikon Components has operated as the Advanced Technologies Segment.

On 2 March 2012, Oerlikon signed a contract of sale with Tokyo Electron for its solar division, Oerlikon Solar, which employed 675 people at eight locations around the world, including its headquarters in Trübbach, Switzerland, near the border to Liechtenstein. Tokyo Electron Limited is one of the world's leading suppliers of semiconductor production equipment and is active in R&D, manufacturing and sales in a wide range of product fields. The sale of Oerlikon Solar was finalized on 27 November 2012.

On 3 December 2012, Oerlikon announced that it was selling two business units from its Textile Segment – Natural Fibers and Textile Components – to the Chinese Jinsheng Group, to allow the Textile Segment to focus on its manmade fibers business. The sale of the Natural Fibers business unit was finalized on 4 July 2013.

On 2 June 2014, Oerlikon acquired Metco from Sulzer AG, integrating it into its existing Coating Segment to create a global provider of surface solutions in the form of the Surface Solutions Segment, currently the company's largest Segment.

On 23 December 2014, Oerlikon announced that it had reached an agreement on the sale of its Advanced Technologies Segment to the Swiss company Evatec AG. This sale was closed ahead of schedule and the Segment's 200 employees and all of its assets were successfully transferred to Evatec on 3 February 2015.

In July 2016 Oerlikon announced that all approvals for a strategic divestment of Oerlikon's Vacuum business to Atlas Copco have been received. The transaction was successfully closed on 31 August 2016.

In November 2016, Oerlikon announced that they will be building a new manufacturing facility in Plymouth Township, Michigan. This facility will be used to produce materials for additive manufacturing and surface coatings. There will also be a research & development (R&D) lab for further developments of titanium and other alloys at this facility.

In July 2018, Oerlikon announced that it had signed a definite agreement for the sale of its Drive Systems Segment to Dana Inc. The transaction was closed on 28 February 2019.

=== Ownership structure ===
The ownership structure of OC Oerlikon has gone through numerous drastic changes over the years, partly due to some large options transactions. When the company was recapitalized, its shareholder structure changed once again. Oerlikon's Annual Report 2021 gives the shareholder structure as follows:

Percentage stake	Shareholder	Remarks
42,7 %	Liwet Holding AG	
3,9 %	OC Oerlikon	
53,4 %	Public float	

=== Board of directors ===
The board of directors is responsible for the supervision and strategic management of the company. At Oerlikon's 42nd Annual General Meeting of Shareholders, Michael Suess was appointed chairman of the board of directors.

== History ==
=== Oerlikon-Bührle ===
The foundations for OC Oerlikon were laid when Oerlikon-Bührle Holding AG was established in 1973. At its peak in 1980, the holding company had 37,000 employees. At the start of the 1980s, the group already had an aerospace division (set up in 1964 as part of Contraves AG) and a thin-film/vacuum technology division, which it had had since 1976 when the company took over Balzers AG. Due to poor performance, in 1991 the group was forced to concentrate on certain divisions only. The decision was taken to restructure the company and focus exclusively on technology. This narrowing of the company's focus was driven by the 1994 takeover of the Leybold Group, a specialist in vacuum technology, which was merged with Balzers to form Balzers & Leybold, a leading company in thin-film technology, which would later become Oerlikon-Bührle's core business.

The biggest turning point for the company came in 1999 with the sale of various core businesses and virtually all interests in other companies that no longer fitted Oerlikon's new business concept. The company sold its arms division, Oerlikon Contraves Defence, to the German Rheinmetall DeTec, where it now operates under the new name of Rheinmetall Air Defence AG. Oerlikon-Bührle Immobilien AG was sold to Allreal Holding where it acquired its present name of Allreal Generalunternehmung AG. The shoe and accessories manufacturer Bally was sold to the US-based Texas Pacific Group. Oerlikon-Bührle was renamed Unaxis in January 2000.

=== Unaxis ===
In mid-2000, Unaxis acquired a majority share in the semiconductor manufacturer Esec AG. Toward the end of that year, it sold Pilatus Flugzeugwerke AG – the last company that did not fit in with the rest of Unaxis' technology portfolio. In December 2001, Unaxis spun off Leybold Optics once again, but retained the vacuum technology division.

At the beginning of 2004, Unaxis was restructured into five Segments: Semiconductor Equipment, Data Storage Solutions, Coating Services, Vacuum Solutions and Components and Special Systems. A merger in March 2004 placed Esec entirely under the ownership of Unaxis. Poor performance in FY 2004 from the semiconductor division of Esec meant losses of CHF 372 million for Unaxis and a slump in its share price. The Esec business unit was eventually sold again in April 2009.

In June 2005, Unaxis' new majority shareholder, the Austrian firm Victory Industriebeteiligung AG, called an extraordinary general meeting where it replaced virtually all of the group's management team. This also saw Thomas Limberger appointed as the new Unaxis CEO. The new management team succeeded in reducing losses massively in 2005, and expressed a desire to abandon the abstract company name "Unaxis" and bring back a well-established company name from the past.

In 2006, the Russian oligarch Viktor Vekselberg acquired a substantial share in the company. At the annual general meeting in May 2006, a suggestion that "Oerlikon" – the name of the village where Werkzeugmaschinenfabrik Oerlikon was founded – be used as part of the company's name was approved. Rheinmetall reacted strongly against the use of the abbreviation OC because of the potential confusion with its subsidiary Oerlikon Contraves, whose abbreviation is also OC. Unaxis was renamed Oerlikon – formally OC Oerlikon Corporation AG – with effect from the beginning of September 2006.

=== Restructuring and recapitalization ===
In 2008 and 2009, the group suffered the full force of the recession that followed in the wake of the global financial and economic crisis. Demand and sales dropped substantially, particularly in the Textile Segment, but also in the company's other Segments. Hans Ziegler was appointed as interim CEO to undertake a major restructuring of the group. According to Oerlikon's Annual Report 2009, more than 2 500 employees were laid off in 2009, and the workforce declined by a further 1 100 as a result of companies being sold off. A comprehensive restructuring of the group's finances was also necessary. Following lengthy negotiations, an agreement was reached with Oerlikon's main shareholder, Renova, and the lending banks, which was approved by the company's shareholders at the annual general meeting on 18 May 2010.

The key points of the recapitalization were a reduction in equity capital through a par value reduction from CHF 20 to CHF 1, followed by a capital increase with a subscription right offer and the issue of options for shareholders. CHF 125 million of the company's debts were erased and an old credit facility was replaced with a new contract for three tranches totaling CHF 1.48 billion. The recapitalization resulted in a reduction in debt of CHF 998 million and liquid assets of CHF 276 million for the group.

=== Transformation of company through acquisitions and divestments ===
On 22 November 2011, the group reorganized its largest and most important Segment, the Textile Segment, combining the existing five business units into three: Manmade Fibers (formerly Oerlikon Barmag and Oerlikon Neumag), Natural Fibers (formerly Oerlikon Schlafhorst and Oerlikon Saurer) and Textile Components (formerly Oerlikon Textile Components).

In the course of this reorganization process, the Segment's upper management was gradually relocated to Shanghai, and hence to the world's largest textile market. The new CEO of the Segment, Clement Woon, is from Singapore.

On 3 December 2012, Oerlikon announced that it was selling two business units from its Textile Segment – Natural Fibers and Textile Components – to the Chinese Jinsheng Group. The sale of the Natural Fibers business unit was finalized on 4 July 2013. Within textile machinery construction, the group plans to concentrate in the future on production machinery for manmade fibers. At the beginning of 2014, OC Oerlikon acquired Sulzer Metco from Sulzer AG.

On 20 November 2015, Oerlikon announced its intention to sell its Vacuum Segment to Atlas Copco. The transaction was closed on 31 August 2016.

In July 2018, Oerlikon announced that it was selling its Drive Systems Segment to Dana Inc. The sale was finalized on 28 February 2019.

In 2023, the company acquired the Swiss specialty zipper manufacturer Riri.
