= ACM Air Charter =

German airline

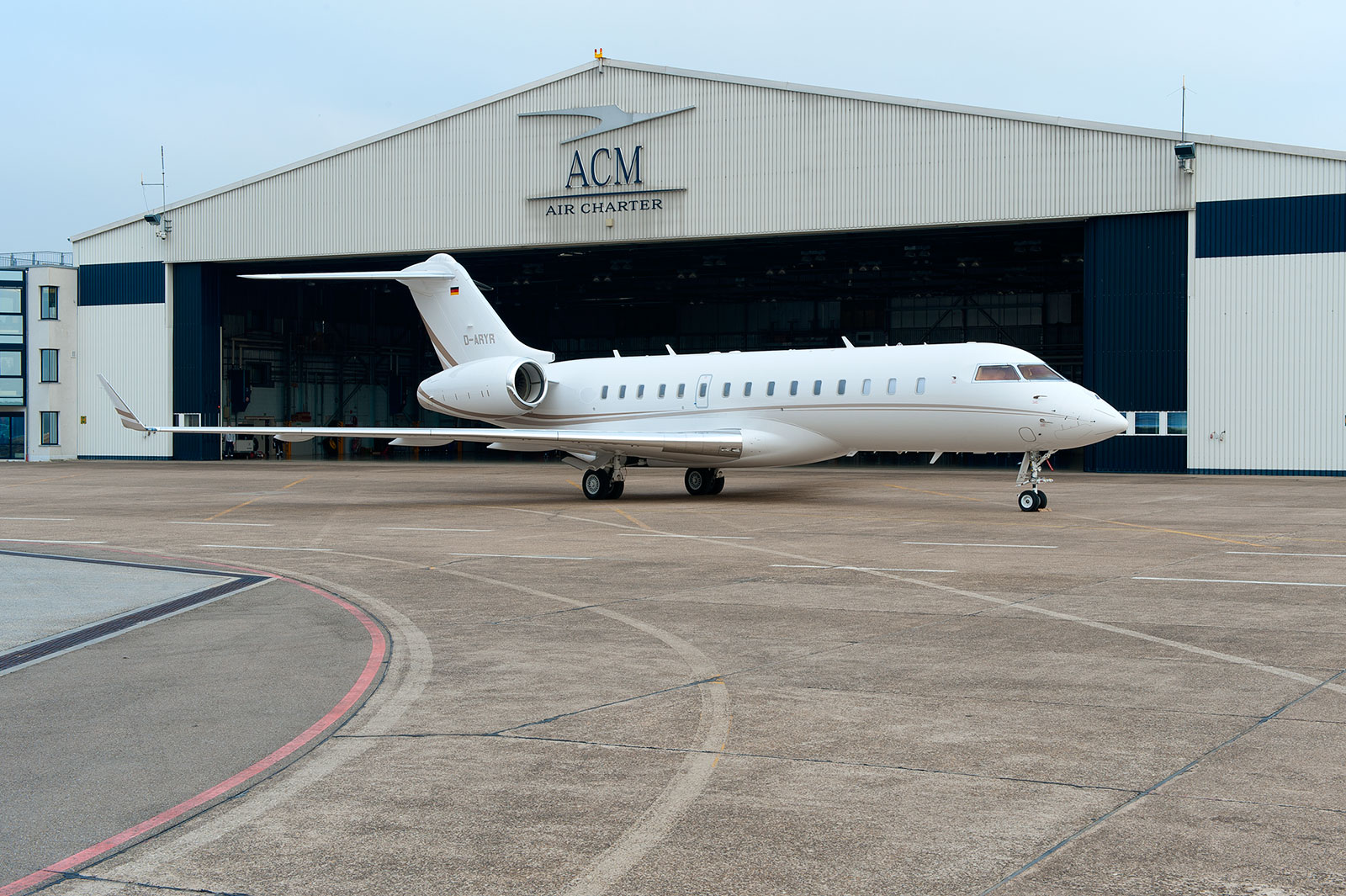
- Bombardier Global 6000
IATA	ICAO	Call sign
—	BVR	BAVARIAN
- Founded: 1992; 34 years ago
- AOC #: D-057
- Hubs: Karlsruhe/Baden-Baden Airport
- Alliance: none
- Fleet size: 8
- Destinations: charter
- Headquarters: Rheinmünster, Germany
- Key people: Clauspeter Schwarz; Dr. Andreas Schirmeisen; Thomas Minninger
- Employees: 105
- Website: acm.aero

ACM Air Charter is a German airline based at Karlsruhe/Baden-Baden Airport. In addition to charter flights and aircraft management the airline operates the business aviation terminal and a maintenance facility at its homebase airport.

== History ==
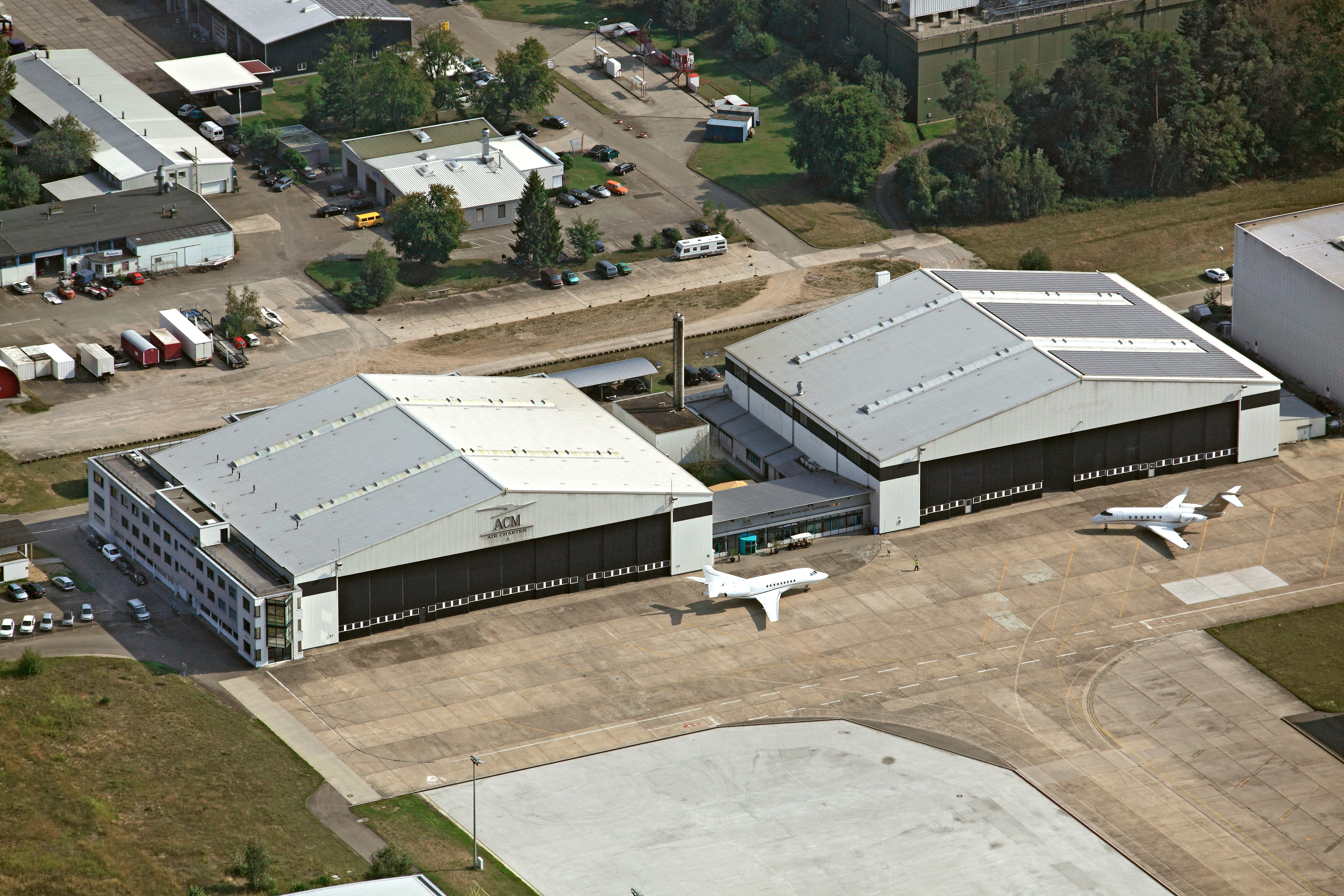

ACM Air Charter was founded in 1992 in Baden-Baden. One year later in 1993, flight operations commenced. In 1997 the airline moved its headquarters to Karlsruhe / Baden-Baden Airport, where the company now also owns two hangars. It created a second business area with its maintenance department. In 1998 the airline received the approval for line and base maintenance. In the same year the first commercially approved Bombardier Challenger 604 in Germany was put into service, enabling long-haul charter flights.

In 2008 the first ultra-long range business jet was added to the fleet. The Bombardier Global Express XRS allows nonstop transatlantic flights and flights to Asia. The licence to operate the first commercially registered Dassault Falcon 7X in Germany was extended in 2010, adding another ultra-long range jet to the airline’s fleet.

In 2011, ACM Air Charter went into an agreement with Continuum Applied Technology for the implementation of the CORRIDOR Aviation Service Software, an application designed to automate all aspects of the complex maintenance of aircraft.

In 2014 ACM Air Charter received its second Boeing BBJ 2, offering ultra-long haul flights with a modern and high-class business aircraft.

Due to the new Part-NCC regulation, which entered into force in 2016, ACM took over the operation of a non-commercial Embraer Phenom 300 in March 2017.

ACM Air Charter also offers line maintenance services for aircraft of the Airbus A320 family and Boeing 737NG family at its home airport.

2022 and 2023 saw the acquisition of two new Bombardier Global 7500s. Upon joining the fleet, It now has a total of eight Bombardier Global jets. ACM Air Charter is the largest supplier of such jets in Central Europe.

== Fleet ==
As of July 2023, the fleet of ACM Air Charter consists of the following aircraft:

ACM Air Charter fleet
Aircraft	In service	Orders	Notes
Bombardier Global 6000	4	—	
Bombardier Global Express XRS	2	—	
Bombardier Global 7500	2	—	
Bombardier Global 8000	—	1	
Total	8	1	

== See also ==
- List of airlines of Germany
