= Baermann of Limburg =

Baermann of Limburg was a German writer who lived in Frankfurt-am-Main at the end of the seventeenth century and at the beginning of the eighteenth. He published (Frankfurt-am-Main, 1712) a Judæo-German play, with the Hebrew title Mekirat Yosef (The Sale of Joseph), destined for the Feast of Purim, which excited great interest. It was performed in Frankfurt on the Feast of Purim, 1713, with much success, many Christians being present. The actors were Jewish students from Prague and Hamburg. The same comedy was acted in Metz, and became a favorite Purim play among the Polish Jews generally.
