= Gustav Engel (historian) =

German historian

Gustav Engel (24 July 1893 – 17 December 1989) was a German historian.

== Life ==
Born in Quakenbrück, Engel studied art history, English and French from 1912 to 1914. After the beginning of the First World War, Engel was called up before he could finish his studies. He was a prisoner of war until March 1920. Afterwards, Engel completed an apprenticeship in a bookshop to become an independent bookseller. From 1935, he was employed in the municipal archive in Bielefeld and studied in Münster with half his time of service. He finished his study in 1938 and received his doctorate with the thesis Geistiges Leben in Minden, Ravensberg und Herford während des 17. und 18. Jahrhunderts.

Engel was chairman of the Historical Association for the County of Ravensberg from 1944 to 1968. Since 1990, the association has awarded the Gustav Engel Prize annually in memory of his work. Since 1946 he had also been a full member of the Historical Commission for Westphalia and was appointed honorary member on 24 April 1974. His burial place is on the Sennefriedhof in Bielefeld where he died at the age of 96.

== Publications ==
Monographs

- Enger – Ein Heimatbuch zur Tausendjahrfeier (1948). Bertelsmann, Gütersloh 1948
- Stadt und Kreis Bielefeld (Kreis- und Stadthandbücher des Westfälischen Heimatbundes, vol. 11). Regensberg, Münster 1950
- Die Stadtgründung im Bielefelde und das Münstersche Stadtrecht. Bielefeld, 1952
- Bielefeld zwischen gestern und morgen. Berlin / Holzminden 1954
- Spenderliste und Bautagebuch für den Bau des Bielefelder Gymnasiums im Jahre 1608: nach der Abschrift Reinhold Meyers. Küster, Bielefeld 1958
- Bielefeld: Bild einer Stadt. Impressionen und Profile. Edition Peters, Bad Honnef 1960, ISBN 3-88024-013-2
- Bielefelds Platz in der Geschichte der Städte Westfalens: Rede zur 750-Jahrfeier der Stadt Bielefeld. 1964
- Bielefeld: Gesicht und Wesen einer Stadt. Pfeffer, Bielefeld 1975
- Herrschaftsgeschichte und Standesrecht: Riege und Hagen, Hausgenossen, Hausgenossenschaften, Malmannen. Pfeffer, Bielefeld 1976
- Landesburg Und Landesherrschaft an Osning, Wiehen Und Weser: Mit Grundrissen, Ansichten Und Rekonstruktionen. Pfeffer, Bielefeld 1979, ISBN 3-88024-028-0
- Politische Geschichte Westfalens. 4th edition, Grote, 1980, ISBN 3-7745-6442-6
- Die Westfalen: Volk, Geschichte, Kultur. Westfalen Verlag, 1987, ISBN 3-88918-051-5

Essays

- Westfalen ist verschwunden. In Die Zeit, Nr. 22/1953
