= St. Andrew's Church, Lübbecke =

Coordinates: 52°18′06″N 8°37′06″E

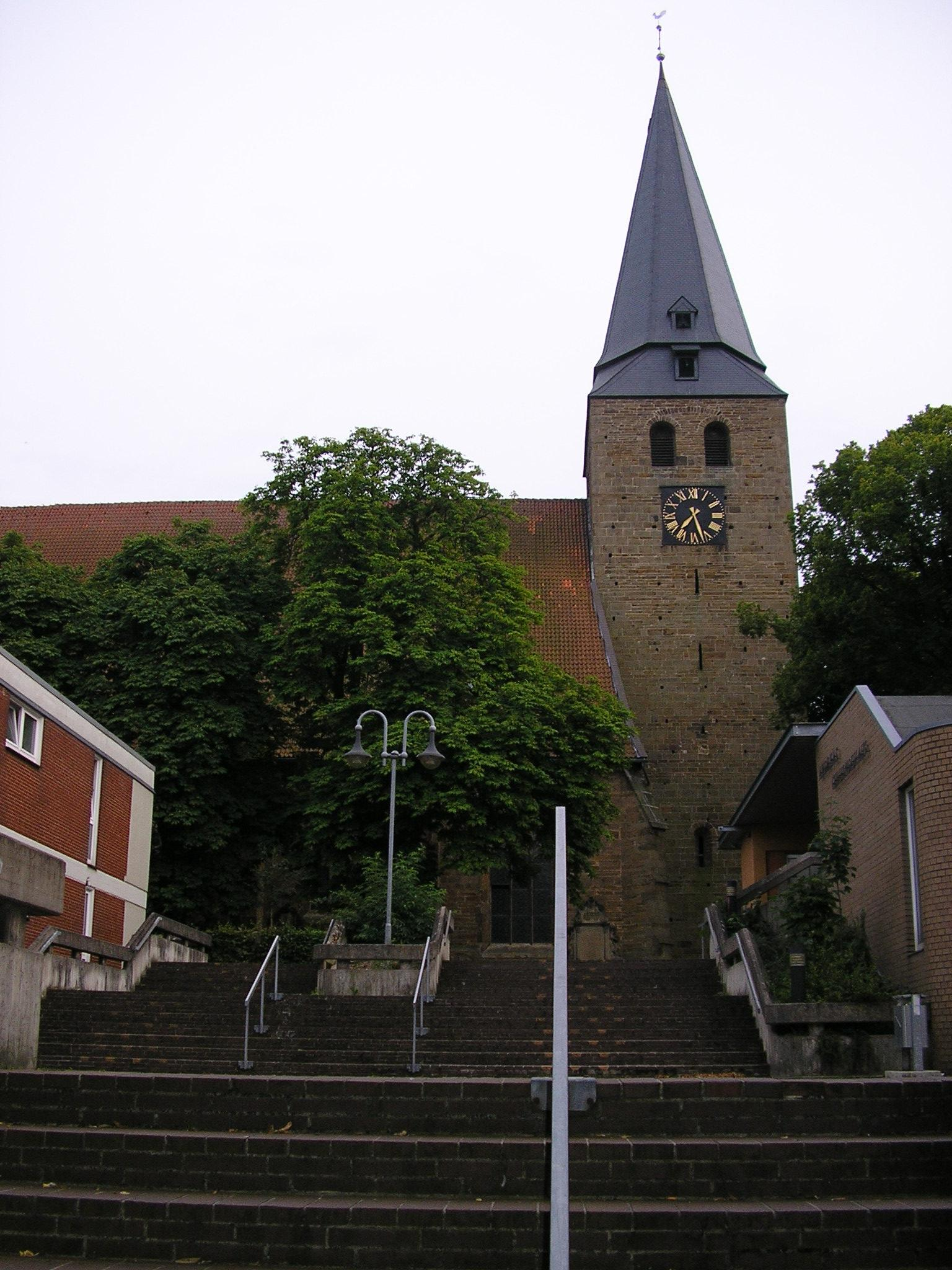
The tower of the church is around 70 metres high.

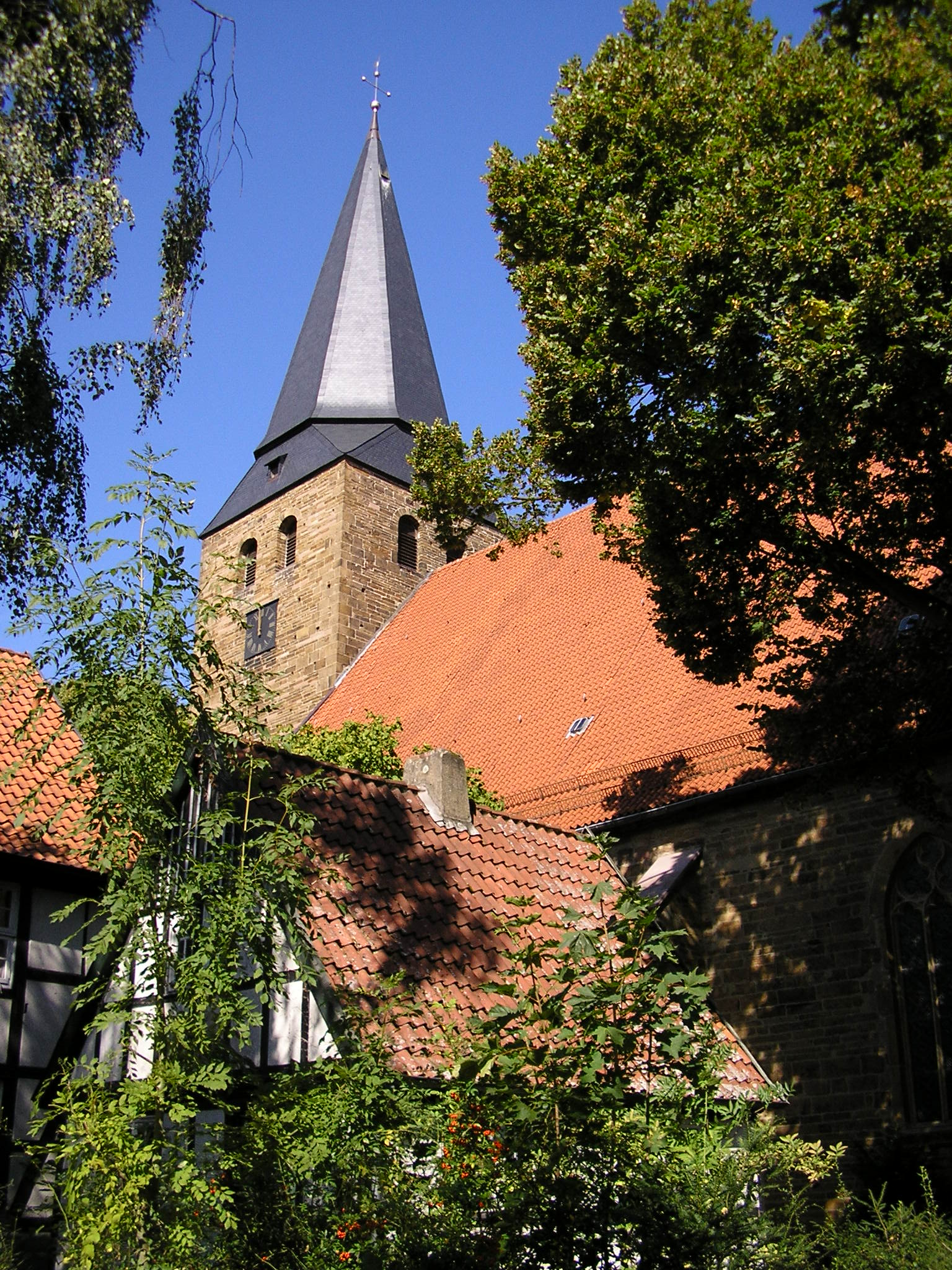
St. Andrew's

The present-day Evangelical-Lutheran parish church of St. Andrew (St. Andreas) in Lübbecke is one of the ancient parishes (Urpfarreien) of the Bishopric of Minden.

== Construction history ==
The originally single-nave, cross-shaped building with a west tower was built, probably from 1160 to 1180, in the Romanesque style. In 1350 it was converted into a Gothic hall church by the addition of two side aisles. This change of style can still be clearly recognised in the interior of the church. As the inscribed stone dating to 1350 states in Latin "In the year 1350, when the plague came, when the Geisler was carried out and the Jews were killed, this church was extended." During restoration work in 1959–62 the remains of wall and ceiling paintings inside the church were uncovered, some of which dated to as early as the 13th century. The church's fittings include a cup-shaped Gothic baptismal font, a lifesize Christ on the cross made around 1200, and an organ casing from 1628, that was modified in 1642. In addition, a large number of epitaphs have been preserved. The tower is almost 70 metres high, making it one of the highest church towers in a town anywhere in Germany.

== History ==
The collegiate church of St. Andrew in Lübbecke had been founded as a chapter of St. John (Johanneskapital) at Ahlden on the Aller, before it moved to Lübbecke in 1295. In 1280 it was at first moved to Neustadt am Rübenberge and in 1295, for security reasons, to Lübbecke. The Church of St. Andrew in Lübbecke was elevated to a collegiate church. In 1550 the Reformation was introduced at St. Andrew's and the church became a Lutheran parish church. In 1624 there were five Lutheran and a Roman Catholic canon. The collegiate chapter was not abolished until 1810 by the French government in Kassel (Kingdom of Westphalia). The stone of the former castle of Meeseburg on the summit of the Meesenkopf in the Wiehen Hills was supposed to have been used to build the church.

== Oberbauerschaft dependency ==
Until the construction of the church in Oberbauerschaft in 1899 the inhabitants of that village, which lies to the south on the other side of the Wiehen ridge, had to make their way to Lübbecke if they wished to attend services. A forest track to Lübbecke, the Alte Kirchweg ("Old Church Way") and a separate entrance door on the north side of St Andrew's are witness to this historical situation. Since the end of 2008 the tower of the church has been externally lit at night by floodlights.

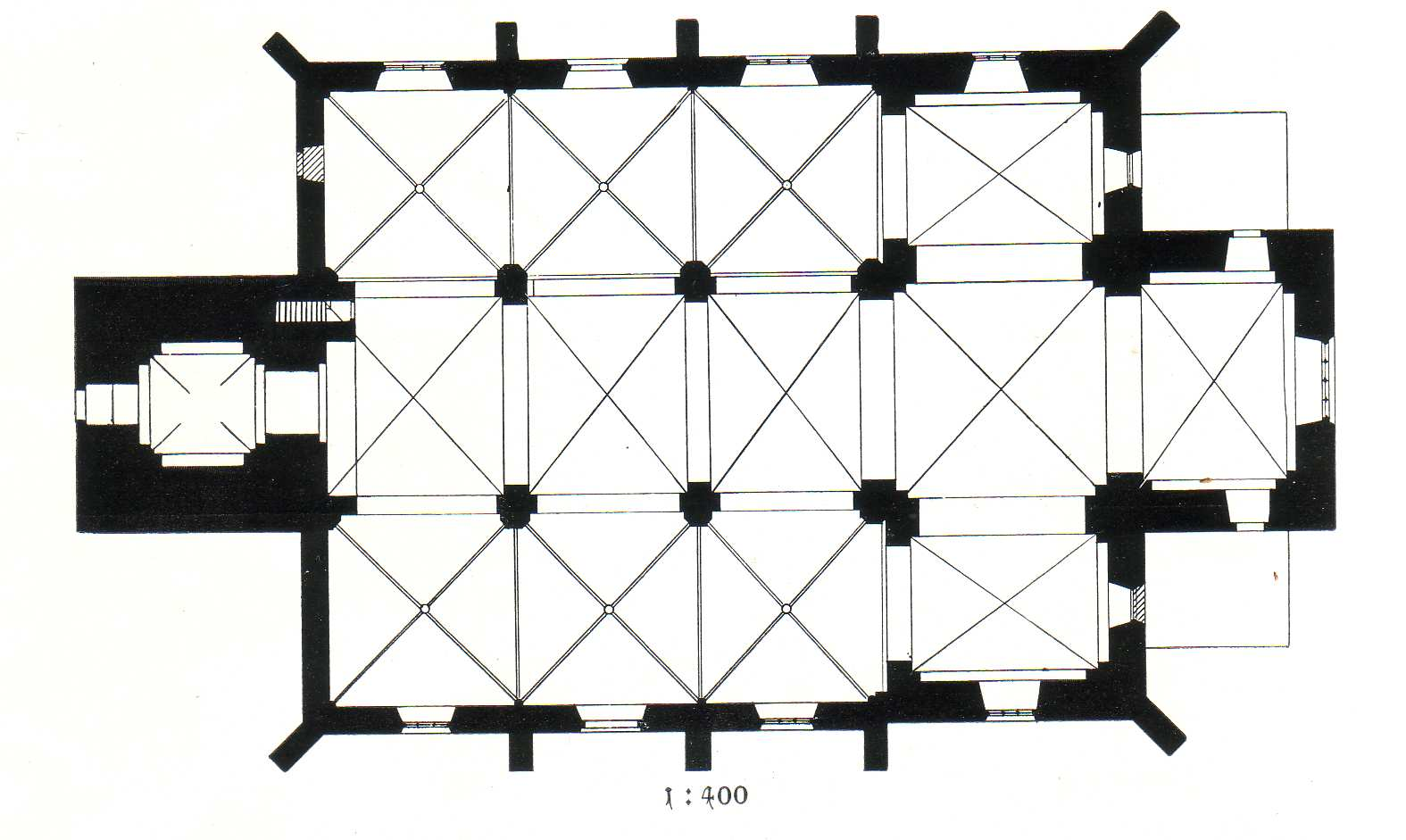
1907 floor plan

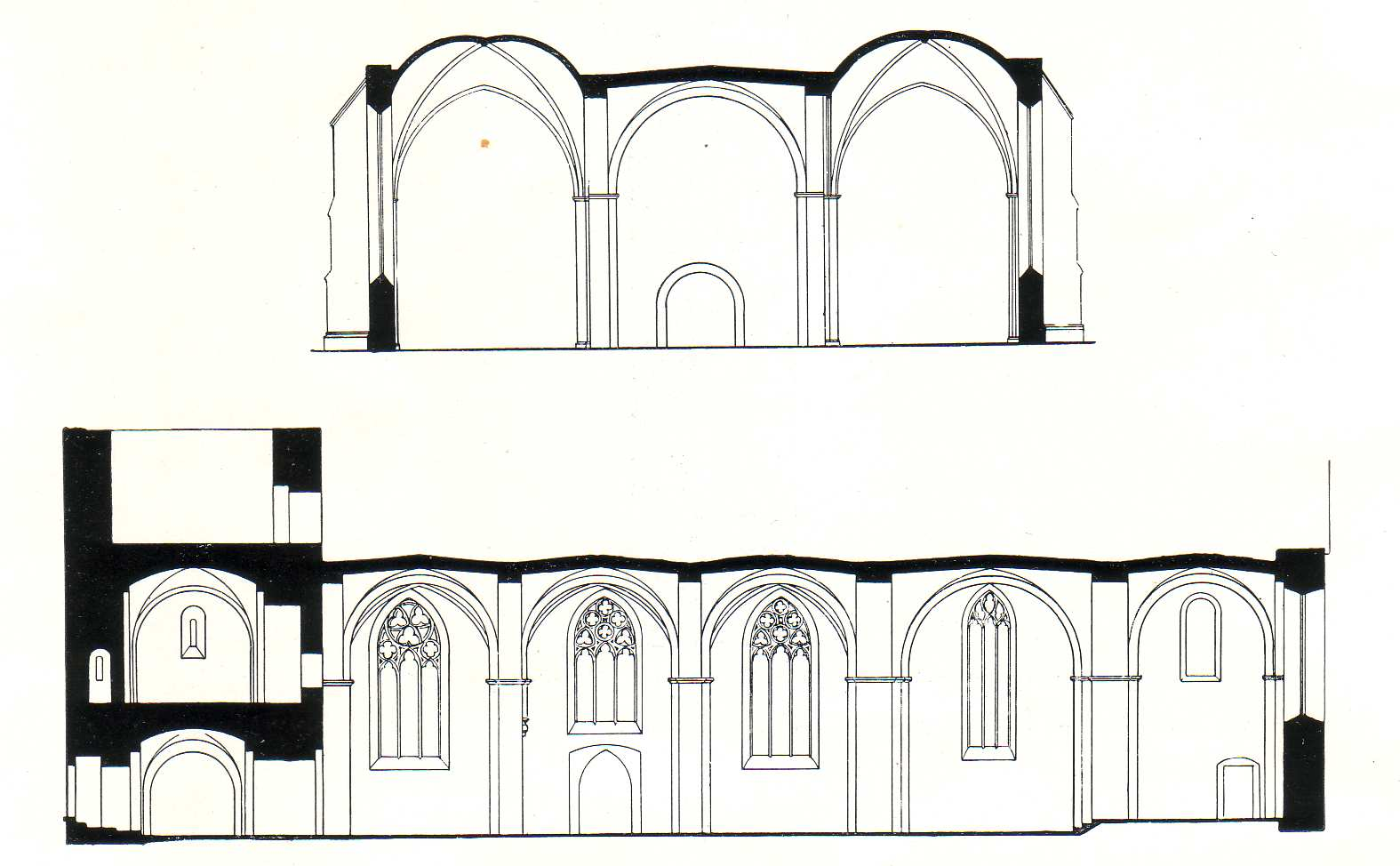
Side and end views in 1907

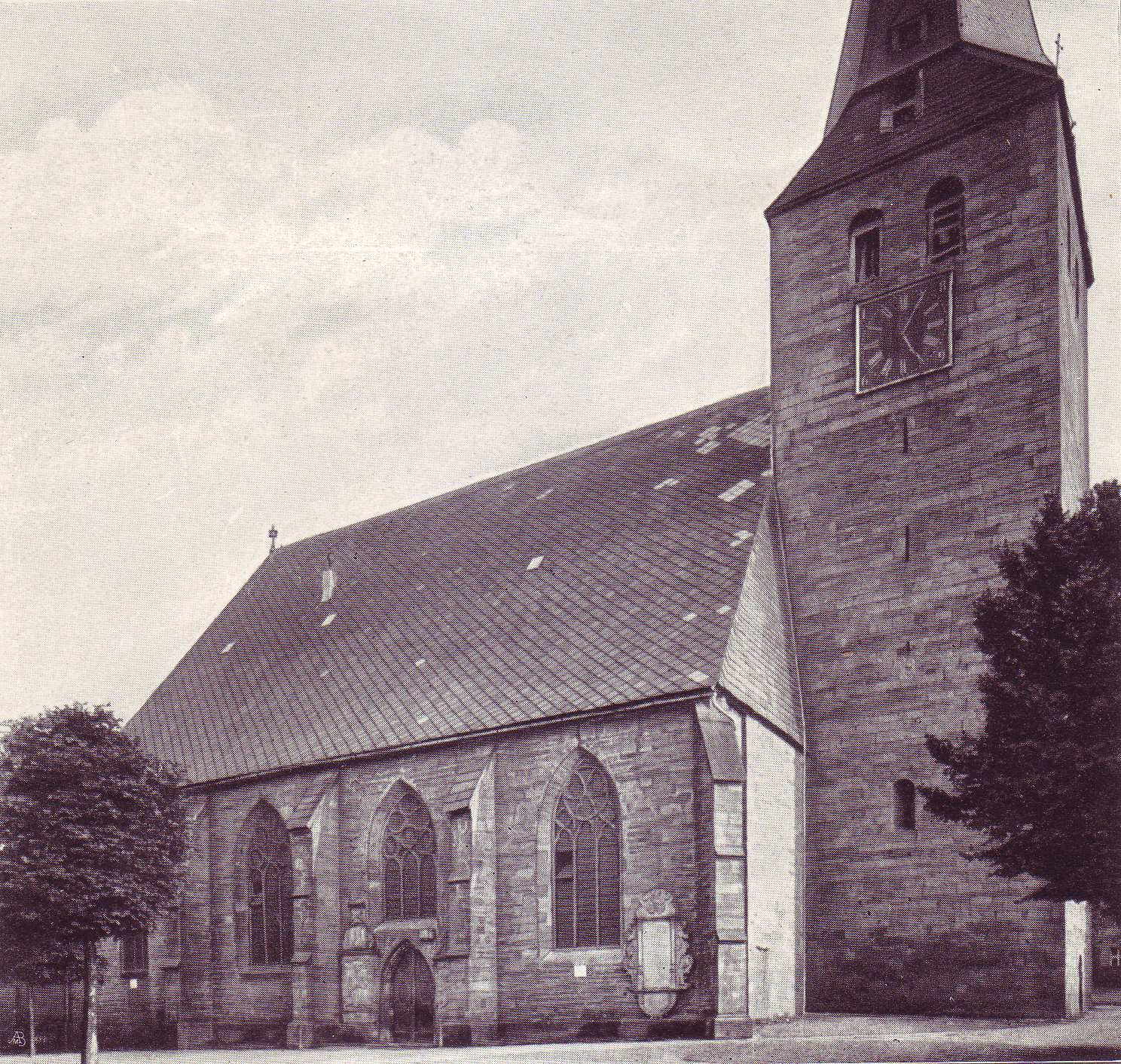
St. Andrew's in 1904

== Literature ==
- Helmut Hüffmann: Die St. Andreas-Kirche in Lübbecke. Lübbecke 1990.
- Maria Spahn: Das Kollegiatstift St. Andreas zu Lübbecke. Ein Beitrag zur Stadtgeschichte. In: Mindener Beiträge 17. Minden 1980.
- Westfälisches Klosterbuch. Band 1, S. 546–550.
