= Meesenkopf =

- Location within North Rhine-Westphalia

Highest point
- Elevation: 225.8 m above sea level (NN) (741 ft)
- Coordinates: 52°17′37″N 8°37′29″E

Geography
- Location: North Rhine-Westphalia, Germany
- Parent range: Wiehengebirge

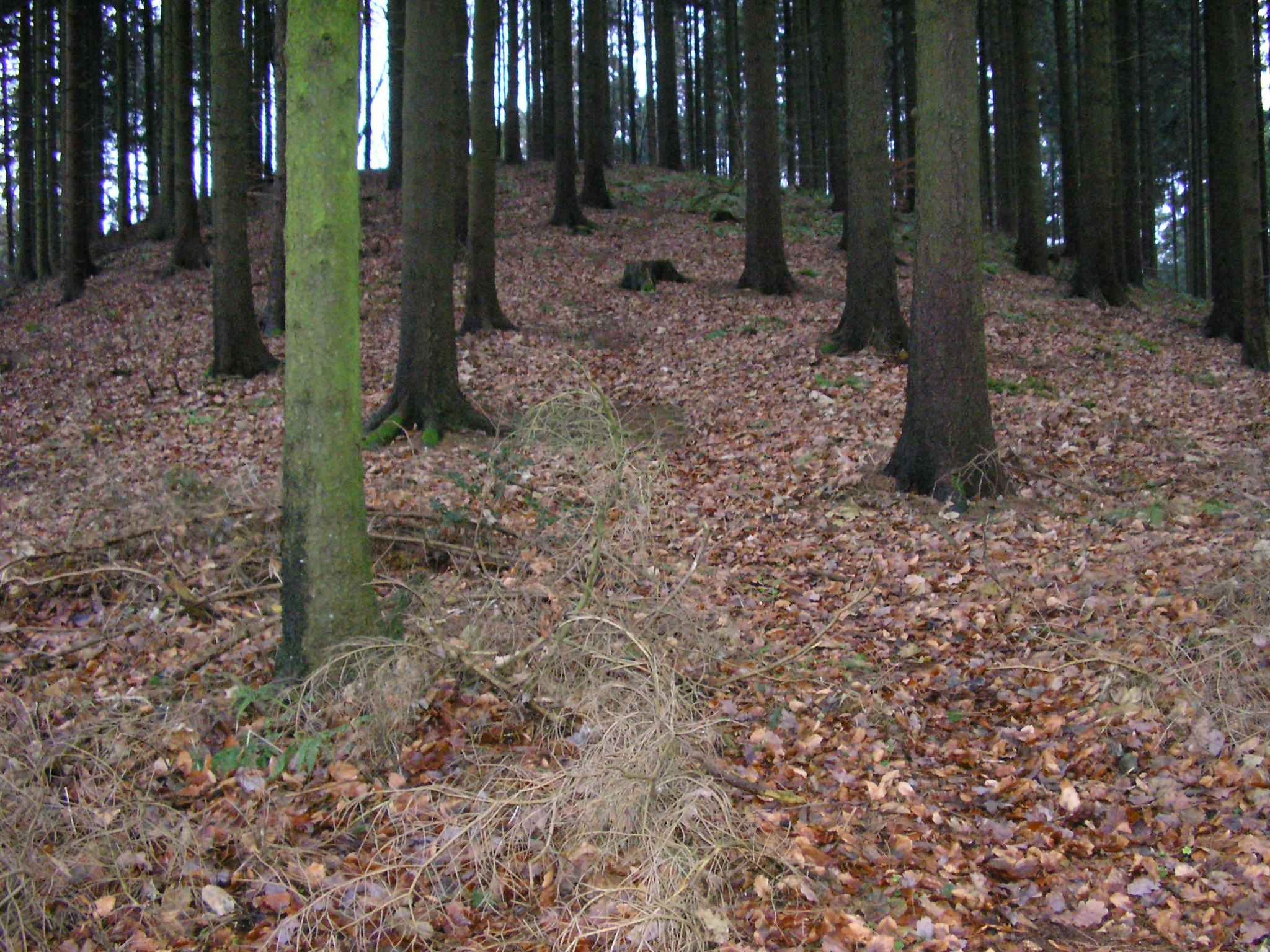
Only this beaten path shows the way to the summit

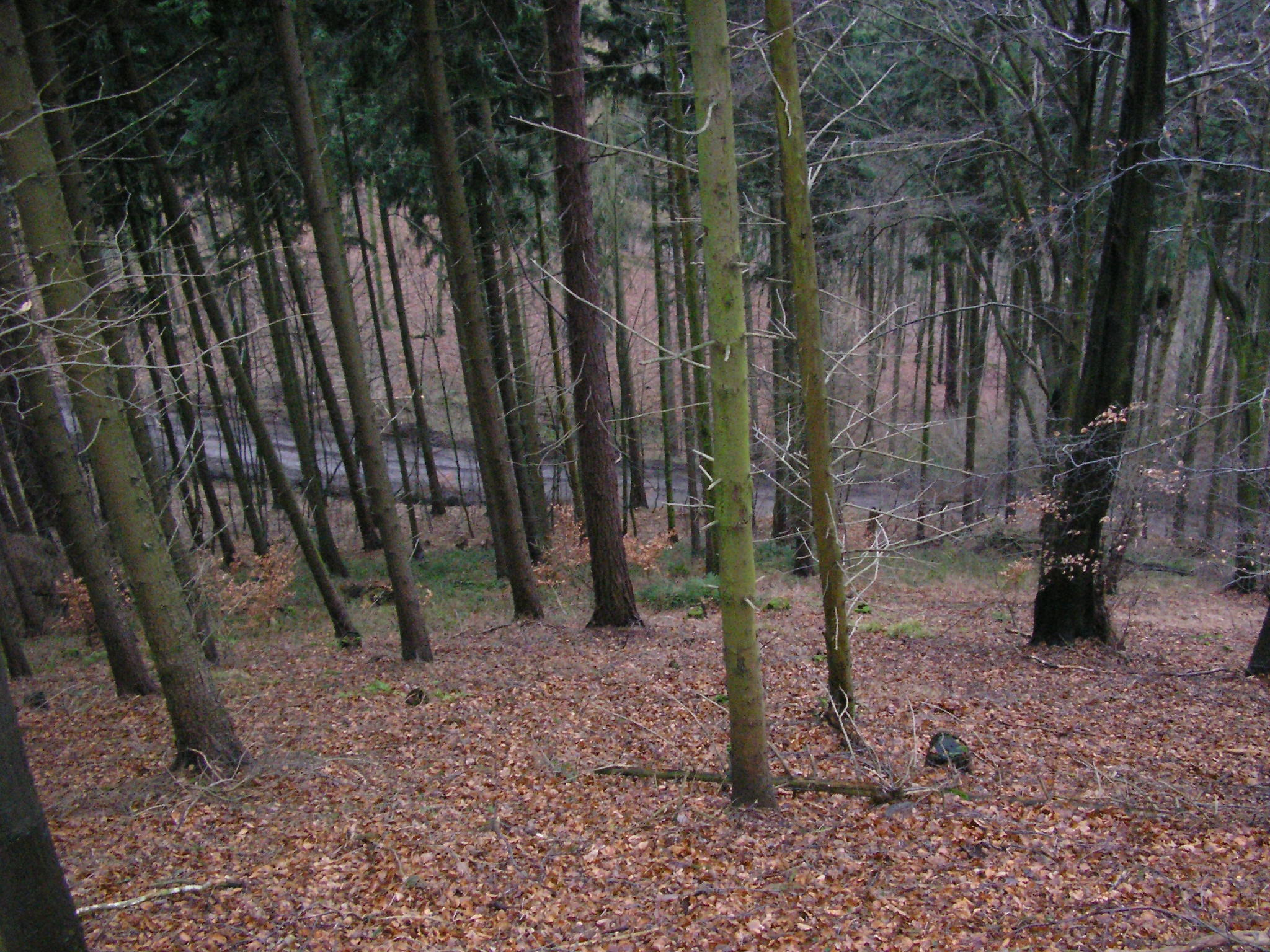
View from the Meesenkopf of a forest track

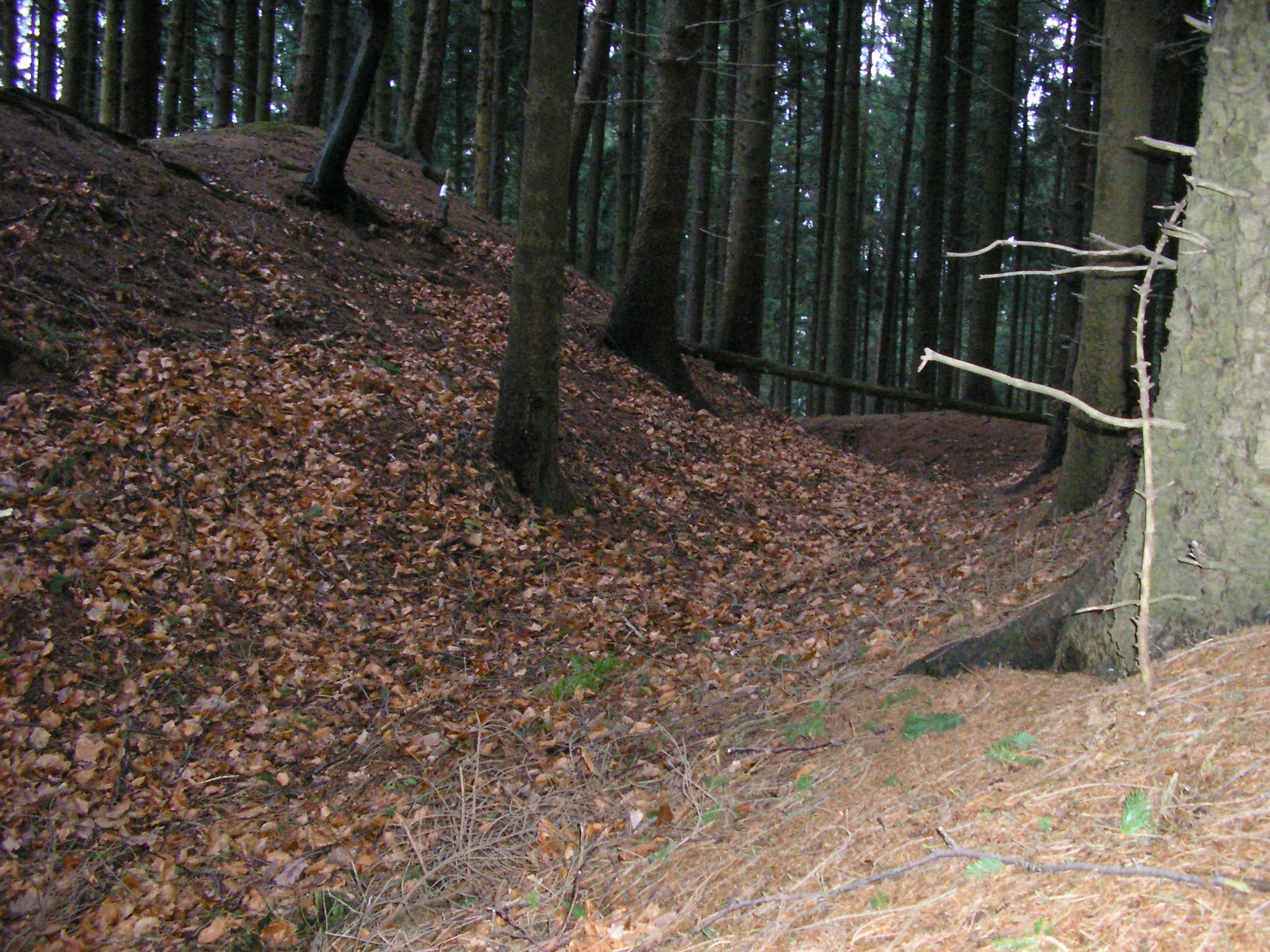
The old castle ditch is still recognisable 800 years after the castle was torn down

The Meesenkopf, also called the Mesenkopf, is a hill in the Wiehen range, south of the town of Lübbecke in Northern Germany. Whilst not particularly prominent, the hill is historically significant as the site of a medieval castle.

== Topography and access ==
With a height of 225.8 m above sea level (NN), the Meesenkopf is topographically unspectacular for this part of the Wiehen Hills. There are much higher summits in its immediate vicinity, such as the 320-metre-high (1,050 ft) Heidbrink, just under one kilometre away to the south, and the 276-metre-high (906 ft) and better-known Reineberg, Lübbecke's local hill, which is 300 metres to the east, west of the Ronceva valley. Today the Meseberg has no particular importance for hikers, and on most maps it is not even shown. The hill can be climbed on forest tracks in around 30 minutes, although there is no established way to the summit itself, only a path that a few hikers over the years have beaten, which aids those making for the top.

== The Meesenburg ==
A castle, the Meesenburg, was built on the Meesenkopf, probably by Count Otto I of Tecklenburg (1209–1263). This Tecklenburg fort was later conquered and destroyed by the Bishop of Minden, Conrad I of Rüdenberg in a joint military operation with the Bishopric of Osnabrück. The castle on the Meesenkopf is believed to have been subsequently demolished around 1216 at the instigation of Bishop Conrad of Minden. The stone was then used to build St. Andrew's Church, Lübbecke, according to a more recent bishop's chronicler. Today only the rampart and ditch of the castle can still be made out.

== Sources ==
Information about the Meesenburg
