= Westphalian Mill Route =

German cycle route

Coordinates: 52°21′44″N 8°42′34″E

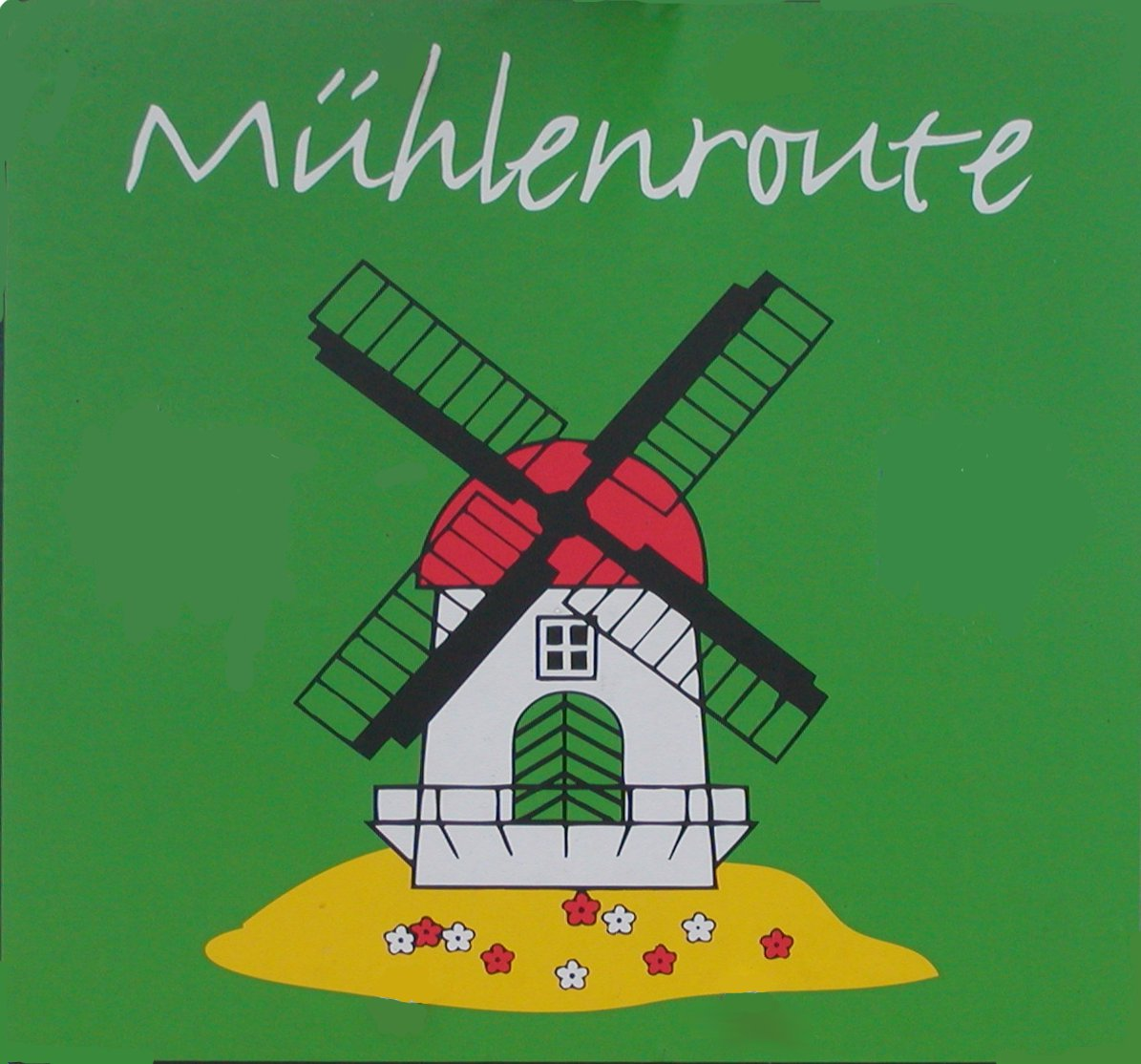
Logo of the mill route

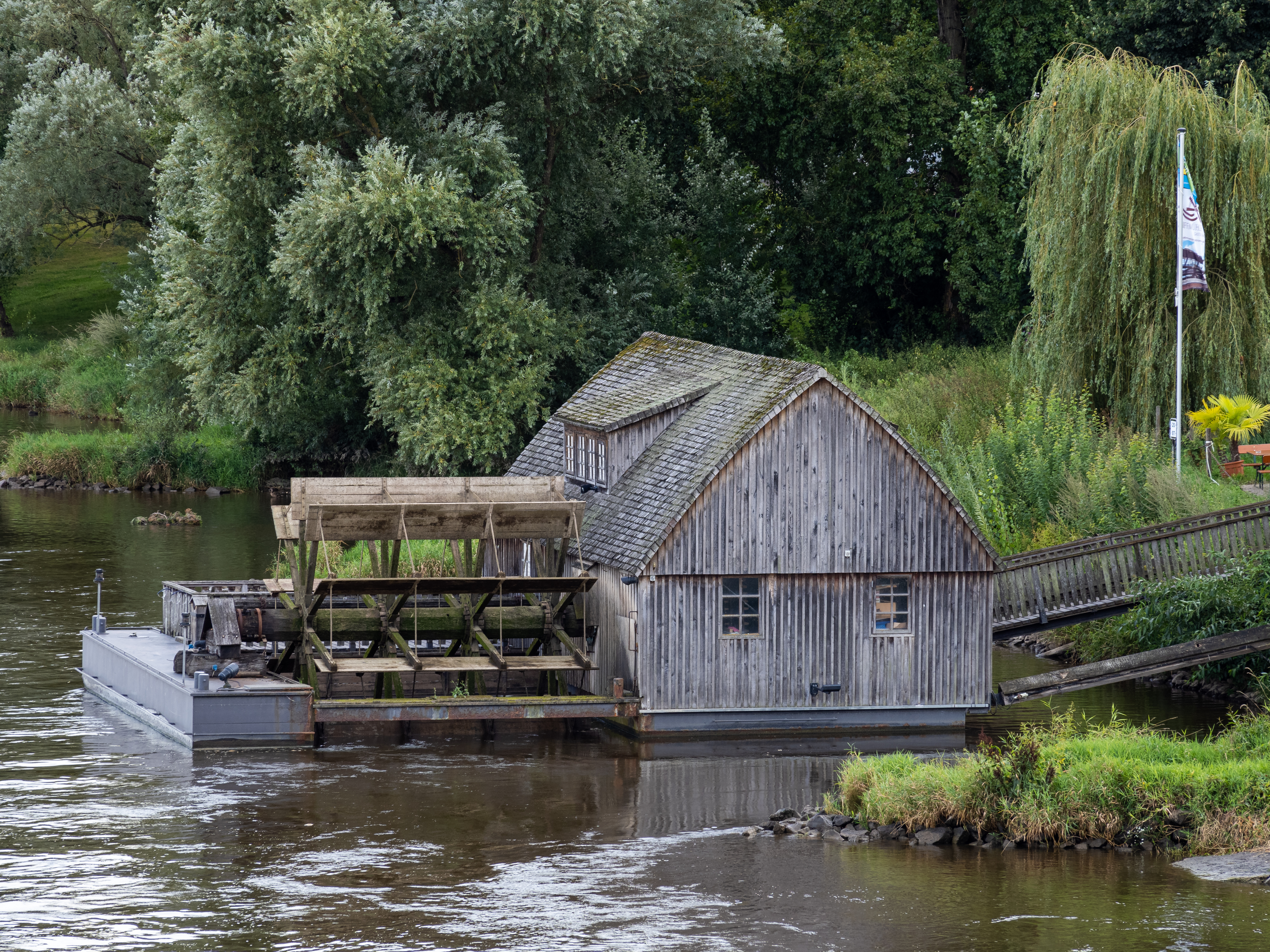
Minden's ship mill (Schiffmühle)

The Westphalian Mill Route (German: Westfälische Mühlenroute) is a circular, long-distance, cycle route in the German district of Minden-Lübbecke and its neighbouring areas in North Rhine-Westphalia. The route is laid out in such a way as to take in 43 historic mills along a circular route of about 320 kilometres.

Running along largely quiet country roads, the Westphalian Mill Route takes cyclists through a cultural landscape dominated by the Wiehen and Weser Hills, the North German Plain and the River Weser. As increasing numbers of tourists have used the network of cycleways, tourist accommodation and restaurants have been established on the main routes.

There are northern and southern variants of the Mill Route. Both may also be combined with the Minden Museum Railway (e. g. at Hille, Südhemmern, Kleinenbremen), the museum railway at Rahden (e. g. Tonnenheide, Rahden) or the Minden pleasure boats (Südhemmern).

== Northern route ==
The northern route starts at the ship mill in Minden. Running initially alongside the River Weser it makes for Petershagen, where it crosses the river. After swinging around in a wide loop it returns to Petershagen via Schlüsselburg. This section is about 65 km long and runs past 11 mills.

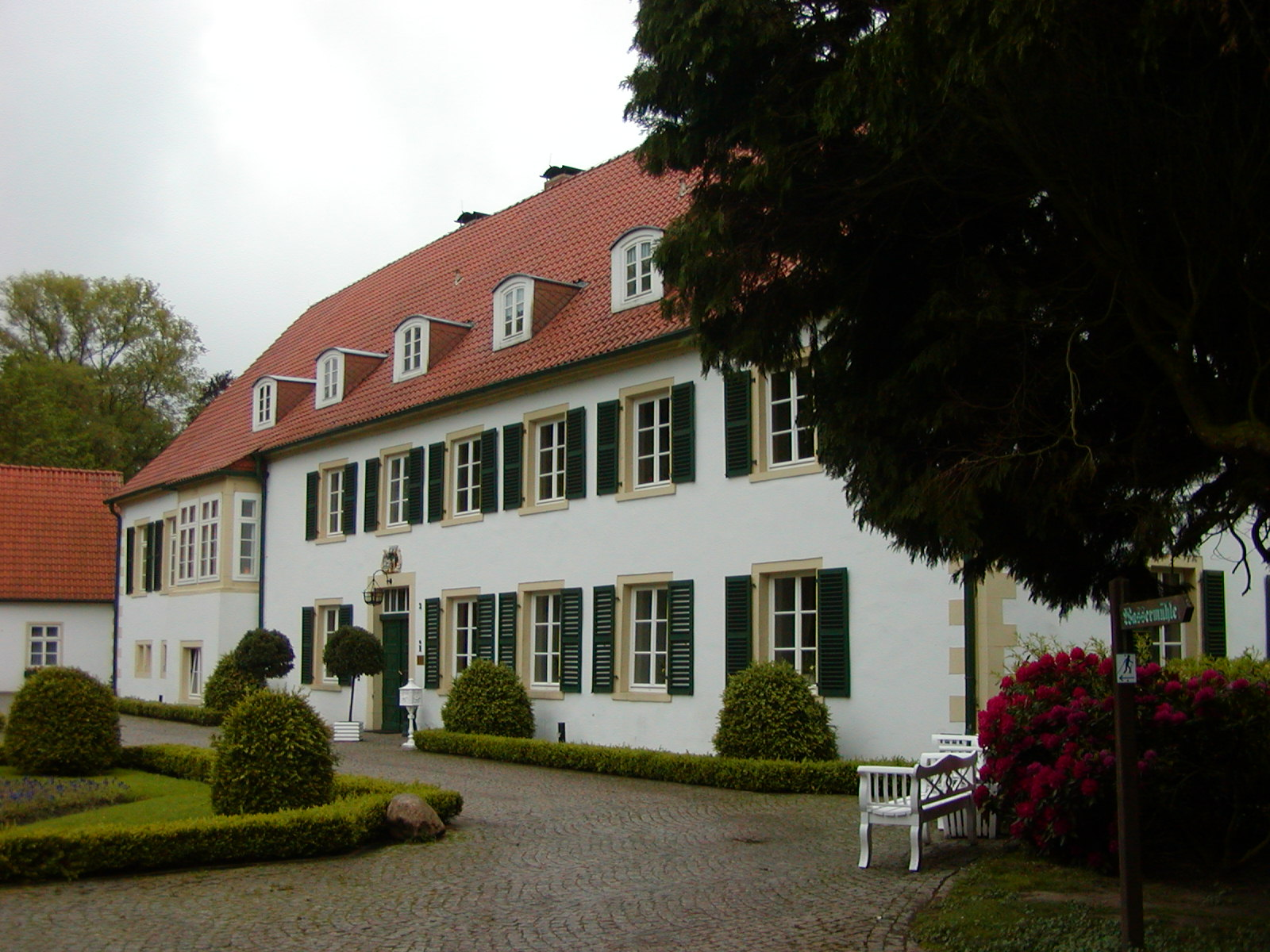
Preußisch Oldendorf-Holzhausen: Haus des Gastes

From Petershagen the cycleway runs through Hille to Espelkamp and Rahden. In the Rahden village of Tonnenheide is the so-called Große Stein ("Great Rock"), the largest glacial erratic in northwest Germany, and in the museum farm (Museumshof) is one of the two Rossmühlen ("Stallion Mills") on the Mill Route. This section is also about 65 kilometres long.

From Rahden the route continues through Oppenwehe to Levern. In the vicinity of Oppenwehe is the Oppenwehe Moor. Its next goal, opposite the Wiehen Hills, is Preußisch Oldendorf, a town with three state-approved climatic health spas. A special route links the palaces and manor houses around the town. From here the cyclist must choose whether to follow the northern variant or southern variant of the Mill Route.

The northern tour goes via Lübbecke and past the Großes Torfmoor before returning to Minden. From Rahden to Minden, the distance is about 85 kilometres.

== Southern route ==
The southern route runs from Preußisch Oldendorf through Hüllhorst, Bad Oeynhausen and Porta Westfalica to Minden. The length of this tour is around 95 kilometres. Unlike the hitherto largely flat section, the route now crosses the heights of the Wiehen(Wiehengebirge) and later the Weser Hills (Wesergebirge).

After visiting the windmill of Hüllhorst-Schnathorst or the water mill of Schöne Mühle in Wulferdingsen (near Bad Oeynhausen) cyclists can switch to the northern route at the so-called Wallücke ("dyke gap") up an incline. The main route continues along the Weser, passing through Holzhausen (wind mill) and along the Weser Cycleway before returning to Minden, avoiding a climb over the Weser Hills. This route runs past Kleinenbremen, where there is the so-called Show Mine.

== Literature ==
- Rad-Spiralo "Mühlenroute" 1: 50,000, BVA Bielefelder Verlag, 2nd reworked edition, 2000, ISBN 3-87073-118-4
- Radwandern im Mühlenkreis Minden-Lübbecke. 1: 50 000. Radwanderkarte, BVA Bielefelder Verlag, 3rd edition, Aug 2005, ISBN 3-87073-053-6
