= Minden Land =

Cultural landscape in East Westphalia

Coordinates: 52.311837°N 8.85498°E

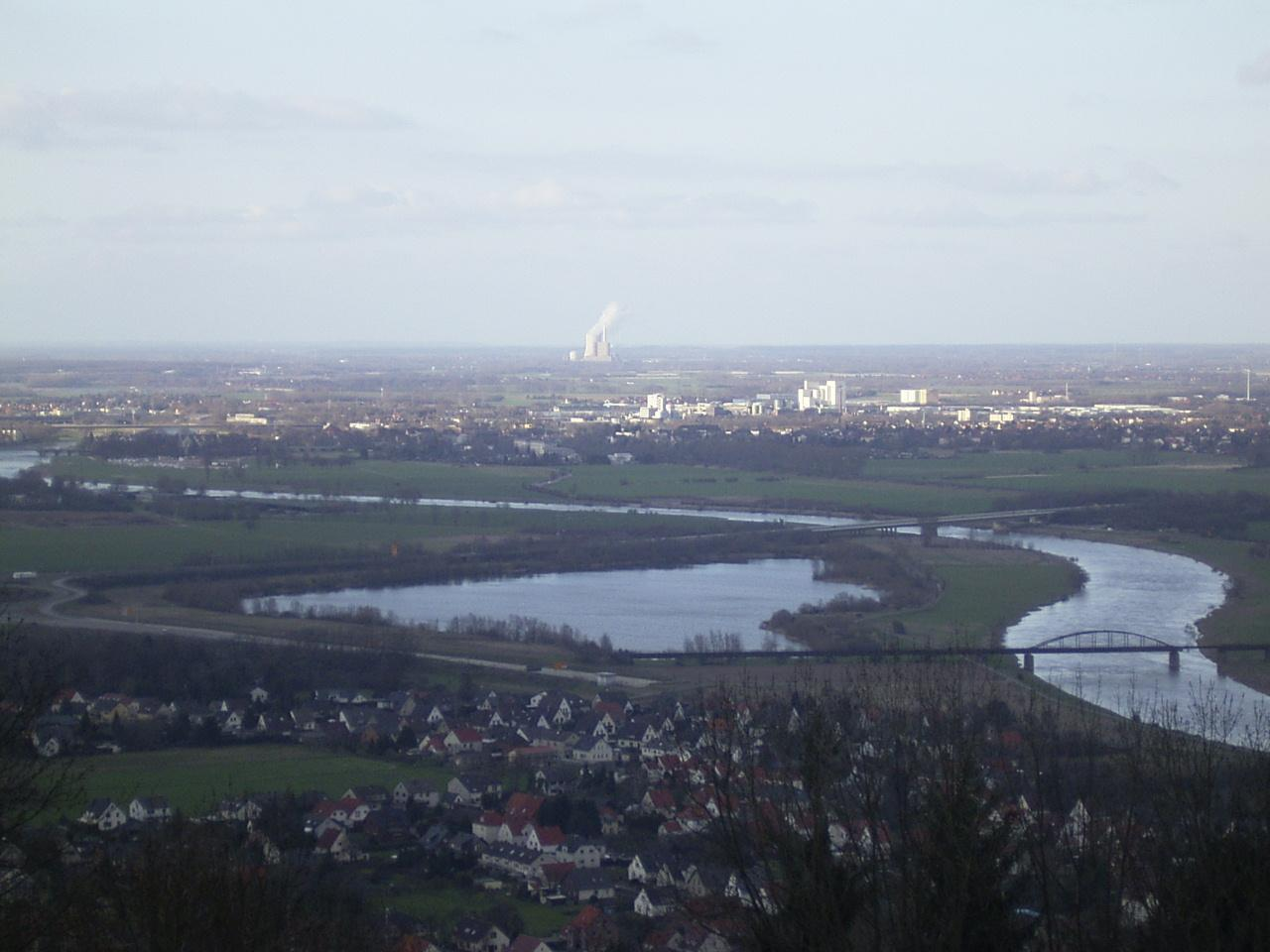
Minden Land

Minden Land (German: Mindener Land) is a cultural landscape in East Westphalia, the northeastern part of North Rhine-Westphalia in Germany. It covers the four-fifths of the district of Minden-Lübbecke that lie on the North German Plain and is clearly bounded to the south by the Weser Hills and Wiehen Hills, where it adjoins the Ravensberg Land and the Upper Weser Valley. Its other boundaries are delineated by those of the district.

Minden Land in its narrower sense includes the towns and villages of Minden, Hille, Petershagen and the northern part of Porta Westfalica, as well as Lübbecke, Espelkamp, Preußisch Oldendorf, Rahden, and Stemwede in Lübbecke Land.
