= Class 74 =

Class 74 may refer to:

- NSB Class 74, a Norwegian passenger train.
- British Rail Class 74, a British electro-diesel locomotive
- DRG Class 74, a class of German 2-6-0 passenger tank locomotives operated by the Deutsche Reichsbahn comprising:
  - Class 74.0-3: Prussian T 11, PKP Class OKi1
  - Class 74.3: LBE T 10
  - Class 74.4-13: Prussian T 12, PKP Class OKi2, SNCB 69, SNCF 130 TC
  - Class 74.66: various locomotives taken over by the East German Deutsche Reichsbahn in 1949
  - Class 74.67: ditto
