= Minden-Ravensberg =

Coordinates: 52°10′14.03″N 8°40′05.57″E

- Prussian administrative
- Interactive map of Minden-Ravensberg

Government
  - Type: Subdivision

Minden-Ravensberg was a Prussian administrative unit consisting of the Principality of Minden and the County of Ravensberg from 1719–1807. The capital was Minden. In 1807 the region became part of the Kingdom of Westphalia, a client state of Napoleonic France. The territory was restored to Prussia after the Napoleonic Wars and became part of the Minden Region within the new Prussian Province of Westphalia in 1815.

== Geography ==
The province consisted of what is now the Ravensberg Land, between the Teutoburg Forest and the Wiehen Hills, and the Minden Land, north of the Wiehengebirge to the North German lowlands. Minden-Ravensberg was bounded to the east by the Weser, while other important rivers were the Westphalian Aa and the Else.

Minden was the regional capital in that time, with other cities such as Bielefeld and Herford being of lower importance. Minden-Ravensberg had a population of 160,301 in 1800 and an area of 2,113 km^{2} in 1806.

== Present-day ==
The territory of Minden-Ravensberg is now within northeastern North Rhine-Westphalia and part of Ostwestfalen-Lippe. It roughly encompasses the districts of Minden-Lübbecke, Herford, northern Gütersloh, and Bielefeld, as greatest town and economic center. Because it belonged to Brandenburg-Prussia for centuries, Minden-Ravensberg is today regarded as a cultural region differing from its neighbors by its Lutheranism and special economic development.
