= Habichtswand =

Coordinates: 52°14′56″N 8°52′13″E

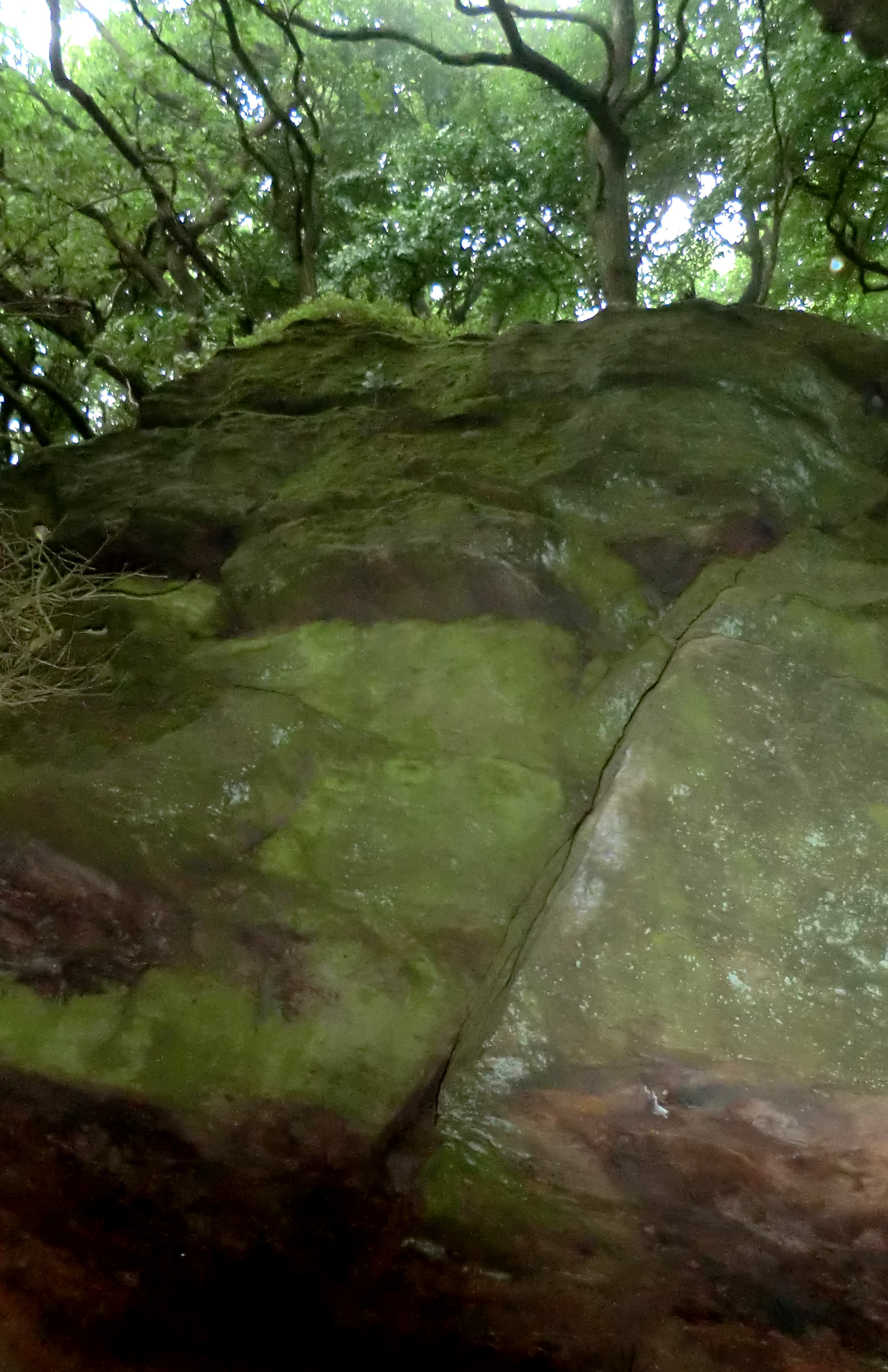
Habichtwand

The Habichtwand is a rock formation located in the city of Porta Westfalica and the district of Minden-Lübbecke within the German state of North Rhine-Westphalia, not far from the city of Minden. The rock is located in the Wiehen Hills. The meaning of the German term "Habichtswand" is "Wall of the Northern Goshawk".
