= Wortmann =

German computer manufacturer

Wortmann AG
- Industry: Electronics
- Founded: 1986
- Headquarters: Hüllhorst
- Area served: Europe
- Products: computers notebooks servers computer monitors
- Revenue: € 700 million (2017)
- Number of employees: 620 (2017)
- Website: wortmann.de

Wortmann AG is a German computer manufacturer, based in Hüllhorst, North Rhine-Westphalia. The main products are computers, notebooks and servers, as well as computer monitors and thin clients. The majority of their products are assembled in Germany and are marketed under their own brand, "Terra".

== History ==
The company was founded in 1986 by Siegbert Wortmann, Gabriele Wortmann and Thomas Knicker as Wortmann Terra Impex Computer- und Datenverarbeitungs GmbH. Shortly after the foundation, they began marketing products under the Terra brand. In 1996 Wortmann had a revenue of over 100 million Euros. In 1998, the enterprise was converted into a Joint-stock company. The company expanded to Switzerland, France and the Benelux countries in 2005.

Siegbert Wortmann, the founder, has been awarded the Order of Merit of the Federal Republic of Germany in 2007 for his work as an entrepreneur. Despite the financial crisis, Wortmann saw an increase in turnover of 12% in 2009 and had a revenue of 350 million Euros and employed 350 people.

Wortmann is one of the few remaining, larger European computer manufacturers. Wortmann products are sold only via speciality retailers. Their main market is Germany, only about 15% of revenue is generated abroad.

Wortmann AG was one of sixteen regional companies that joined forces in 2020 to become OWL Sport & Event GmbH & Co. KG. In December 2021, it was announced that the ATP 500 Noventi Open in Halle, Westphalia, would become known as the Terra Wortmann Open as the company took over as principal sponsor of the tennis event for the next two years.
