= PKP class EU20 =

Polish locomotive class

EU20
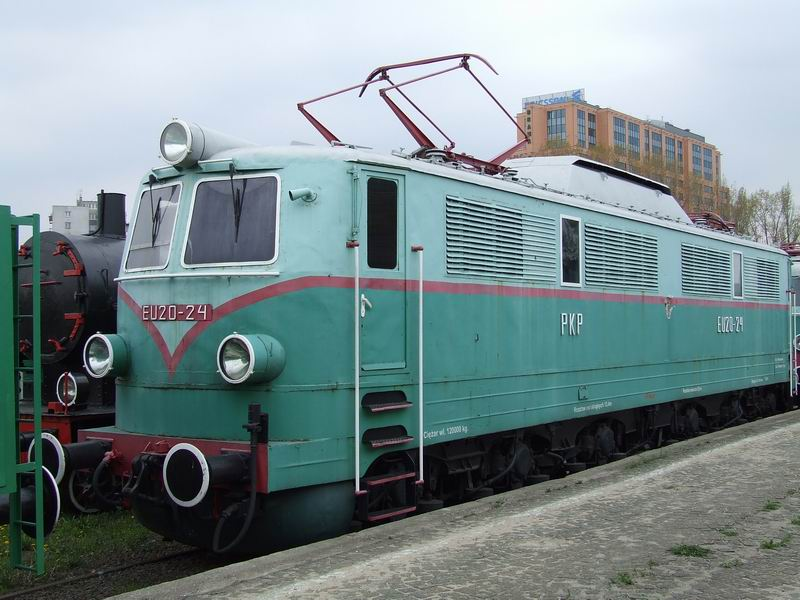
- EU20-24 at the Warsaw Railway Museum, 2006.
Type and origin
- Power type: Electric
- Builder: Lokomotivbau Elektrotechnische Werke (LEW)
- Build date: 1955–1958
- Total produced: 34
Specifications
- Configuration
  - UIC: Co′Co′
- Gauge: 1,435 mm (4 ft 8 1/2 in)
- Wheel diameter: 1,350 mm (4 ft 5 in)
- Length: 18,500 mm (60 ft 8 in)
- Width: 3,050 mm (10 ft 0 in)
- Loco weight: 120 tonnes (120 long tons; 130 short tons)
- Electric system/s: 3000 V DC overhead lines
- Current pickup: Pantograph
- Traction motors: 6 of, gear-ratio 81:21
- Loco brake: Knorr
Performance figures
- Maximum speed: 110 km/h (68 mph)
- Power output: 4,340 hp (3,240 kW)
Career
- Operators: PKP
- Numbers: EU20-01 to EU20-34
- Retired: 1976–81
- Preserved: EU20-24
- Disposition: One preserved, remainder scrapped

The EU20 is an electric locomotive type formerly operated by the Polish State Railways (PKP) in Poland.

== History ==
In production for a mere three years (1955–1958), the series was built at the Lokomotivbau Elektrotechnische Werke works — commonly shortened to LEW — in Hennigsdorf, East Germany. During this time, 34 units were produced with the intention for use as a mixed-traffic locomotive – hence its EU designation – though the reality is that the EU20 saw more use as a freight locomotive than a passenger one. EU20s were the first electric locomotives to be used on the route between Warsaw and Silesia.

The class gained notoriety for its frequent breakdowns due to overheating of resistors, and the lack of additional cooling facilities found in other locomotives.

== Technical data ==
Mechanically, the EU20 was identical to the earlier EU04 (also built by LEW), sharing the same traction engines, rectifiers, and gas compressors.

== Operational history ==
During the series' 26-year service, most units were assigned to the Piotrków Trybunalski depot. EU20s were withdrawn over a 6-year period, beginning in 1976, with the last locomotive being withdrawn in 1981.

== Preservation ==
EU20-24 has been preserved as an exhibit at the Warsaw Railway Museum, and is the only surviving example from the series.
