= Station Museum =

Railway museum in Warsaw, Poland

- Stacja Muzeum

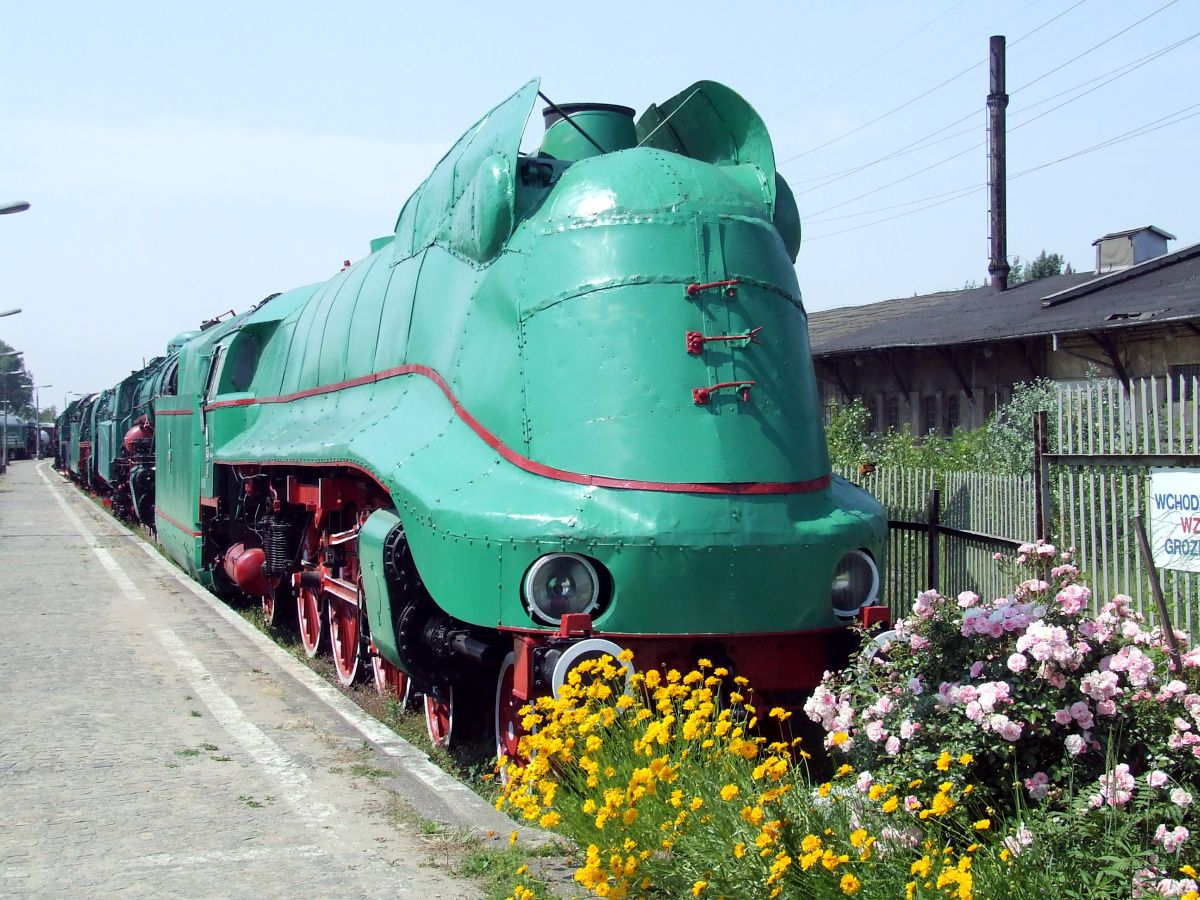
- Former name: Railway Museum in Warsaw
- Established: 1931
- Location: ul. Towarowa 3, Warsaw
- Coordinates: 52°13′32.6″N 20°59′7.55″E
- Type: Heritage railway
- Director: Joanna Kazimierska
- Public transit access: Warszawa Ochota railway station
- Website: stacjamuzeum.pl

The Station Museum (Polish: Stacja Muzeum) is located at the former Polish State Railways (PKP) Warsaw Główna railway terminus and is very close to the Warszawa Ochota railway station. The museum's exhibits are divided into permanent and temporary collections — the latter being displayed inside the museum's galleries. The permanent collection consists of historic rolling stock displayed on the tracks outside, including one of the few remaining armoured trains in Europe. The museum also contains a library which houses many books on the subject of Polish railways.

During the interwar period the museum's headquarters were located at Nowy Zjazd Street.

The museum was reestablished at the present site, as the Railway Museum in Warsaw (Muzeum Kolejnictwa w Warszawie), in 1972.

On 30 July 2009, PKP served notice to quit on the Museum authorities, requiring them to vacate their current location by 31 August 2009. However, as of May 2015, the museum remained in place and open to the public.

The museum was disestablished on 31 March 2016 and on 1 April a new institution, the Station Museum, opened, taking over the exhibits and other assets.

There were plans to move the Station Museum to a new, purpose-built building at the Odolany railway depot but the idea was eventually dropped. An alternative plan was to build new premises for some of the exhibits at the current site as part of the redevelopment but this idea also came to nothing and, as of August 2021, the Station Museum remains open at the old site.

== Exhibits ==
- OKi1-28 Steam passenger tank locomotive, 1904, Germany
- Oi1-29 Steam passenger locomotive with tender, 1905, Germany
- TKi3-119 Steam freight tank locomotive, 1913, Germany
- OKo1-3 Steam passenger tank locomotive, 1920, Germany
- TKh1-13 Steam freight locomotive, 1920, Germany
- Tr6-39 Steam freight tender locomotive, 1923, Germany
- Os24-10 Steam passenger locomotive, 1926, actually Os24-7 with wrong number painted on it, Poland
- OKa1-1 Steam passenger tank locomotive, 1931, Germany
- OKl27-26 Steam passenger tank locomotive, 1931, Germany
- TKbb Nr 10282 Steam locomotive without tender, 1934, Germany
- TKl100-16 Steam passenger and freight locomotive with tender, 1934, Germany
- Pm2-34 Express steam locomotive, 1936, Germany
- EW51-36 Electric Multiple Unit, 1936, Poland
- TKz-211 Steam freight tank locomotive, 1938, Germany
- Pm3-3 Express steam locomotive with separate tender, 1940, Germany
- PzTrWg16 Motorised armoured train, 1942, Germany
- TKp-4147 Steam freight tank locomotive, 1942, France
- Ty2-572 Steam freight locomotive with tender, 1943, Germany
- TKc100-10 Steam passenger tank locomotive, 1944, Germany
- Tr203-451 Steam freight locomotive, 1945, United States
- Ryś 1541 Narrow gauge steam locomotive, 1946, Poland
- Ty42-120 Steam freight locomotive, 1946, Poland
- Pt47-104 Express steam locomotive with tender, 1947, Poland
- Ty43-17 Steam freight locomotive, 1947, Poland
- TKt48-36 Steam passenger tank locomotive, 1951, Poland
- EP02-02 – Electric passenger locomotive, 1954, Poland
- EU20-24 Electric freight and passenger locomotive, 1957, East Germany
- Ty51-228 Steam freight locomotive with tender, 1958, Poland
- ET21-66 – Electric freight locomotive, 1960, Poland
- SM25-002 Diesel shunter, 1962, Poland
- SM15-17 Diesel shunter, 1965, Poland
- ST44-001 Diesel freight locomotive, 1965, Soviet Union
- SM41-190 Diesel shunter, 1966, Hungary

== See also ==
- Narrow Gauge Railway Museum in Sochaczew
