= Minden Museum Railway =

Heritage railway in Minden, Germany

Coordinates: 52°18′02″N 8°54′47″E

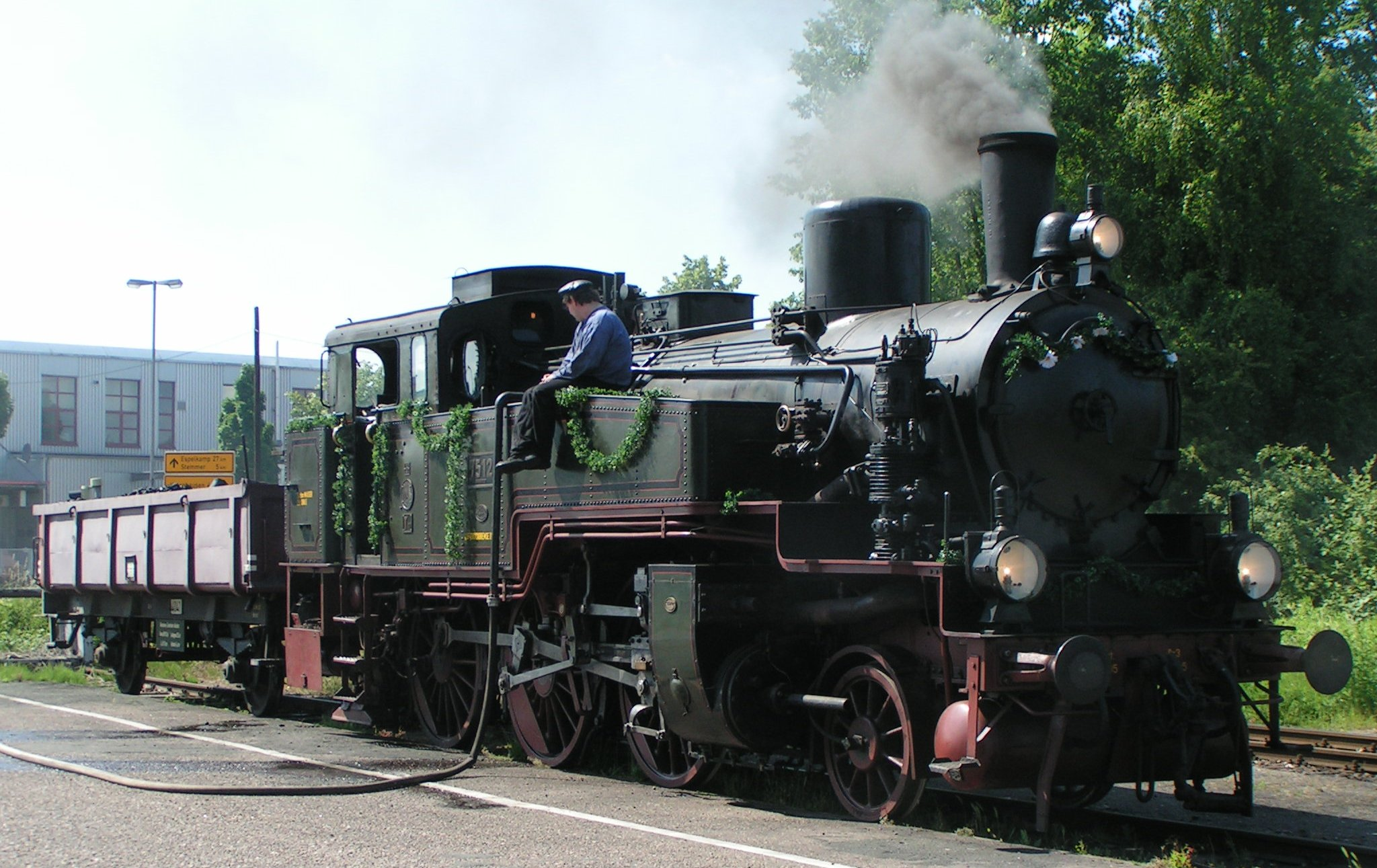
Prussian T 11 locomotive, built from Union Giesserei Königsberg in 1908, at Oberstadt station

The Minden Museum Railway (German: Museumseisenbahn Minden) or MEM was founded in 1977 as a society. Its aim was to preserve historic railway vehicles and operate them on the Minden District Railway (Mindener Kreisbahn or MKB). It was not long before the first museum train worked the line. The museum's vehicles were initially housed in the coach hall of the MKB's old locomotive depot (Bahnbetriebswerk) at Minden Stadt station.

In the same year the MEM gained its first locomotives: The MEM's steam engines Mevissen 4 and the Prussian T 13, STETTIN 7906 (formerly DRG no. 92 638) were taken over from the VEB Erfurt Industrial Railway. At the same time during that first year, locomotives were inspected and repaired on behalf of other museum railways.

The museum's trains run on the lines owned by the Minden District Railway and Wittlage District Railway.

Later the MKB's lines were gradually taken over by the MEM. The society had to move its HQ to Oberstadt station, because its old location and depot at Minden Stadt station was closed and sold. At Minden-Oberstadt station a new shed will be built, around which a large depot can be established with workshops etc.

== Network ==
The MEM could not prevent the dismantling of lines. Of the 80 or so km of narrow gauge network only about 40 km remains, mostly comprising the core routes to Kleinenbremen and Hille.

== Sources ==
- Ingrid Schütte; Werner Schütte: Die Mindener Kreisbahnen. Uhle & Kleimann, Lübbecke 1990. ISBN 3-922657-77-X
- Gerd Wolff: Deutsche Klein- und Privatbahnen. Band 6: Nordrhein-Westfalen (Nordöstlicher Teil). EK-Verlag, Freiburg 2000, ISBN 3-88255-664-1
- Bau und Kunstdenkmäler von Westfalen, Band 50: Stadt Minden, bearbeitet von Fred Kaspar und Ulf Dietrich Korn, Teil V: Minden ausserhalb der Stadtmauern, Teilband 2, S. 1721–1744, Hrsg: Landschaftsverband Westfalen-Lippe, Klartext Verlag, Essen 1998, ISBN 3-88474-635-9
