= August Fick =

German philologist (1833–1916)

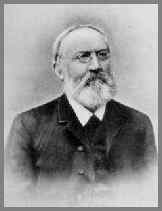
August Fick.

Friedrich Conrad August Fick (May 5, 1833, in Petershagen, Germany – March 24, 1916, in Hildesheim or Breslau) was a German philologist.

He spent his life chiefly at Göttingen, where he first studied philology under Theodor Benfey; became a teacher in the Gymnasium, and eventually in 1876 professor of comparative philology at the university; in 1887 accepted a professorship in Breslau, but retired four years later; author of a variety of learned works on philology.

== Works ==
- "Wörterbuch der indogermanischen Grundsprache, 1868 – His "dictionary of Indo-European parent language" is considered to be the first work of its kind.
- "Die ehemalige Spracheinheit der Indogermanen Europas : Eine sprachgeschichtliche Untersuchung", 1873 – The former speech unit of the Indo-European: A linguistic historical investigation.
- "Die griechischen Personennamen : nach ihrer Bildung erklärt und systematisch geordnet", 1874 – Greek personal names; according to formation and systematic order.
- "Vergleichendes Wörterbuch der indogermanischen Sprachen" Göttingen : Vandenhoeck & Ruprecht, 1890-1909 (4th edition). OCLC: 63812989. – Comparative dictionary of the Indo-European languages.
- "Vorgriechische Ortsnamen als Quelle für die Vorgeschichte Griechenlands verwertet", 1905 – Pre-Greek place names as a source for the history of Greece.
