= PKP class SM15 =

SM15
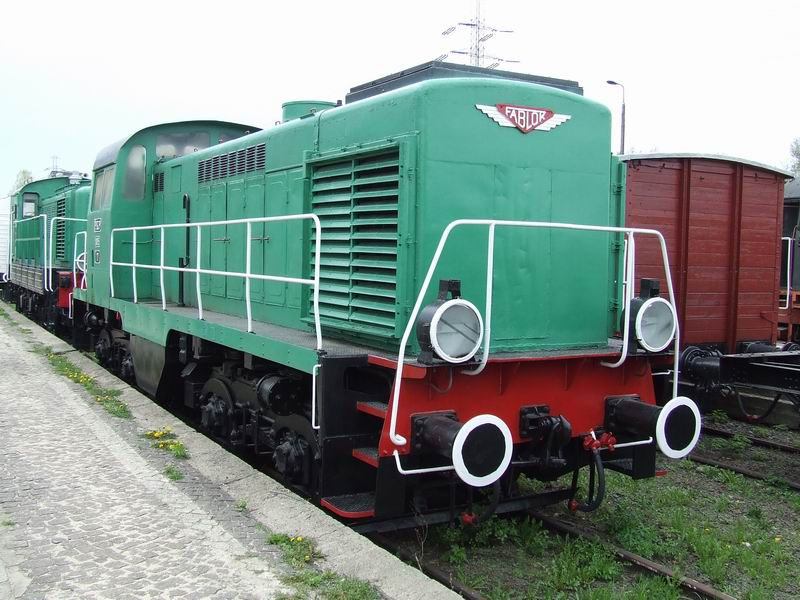
- SM15-17 at the Warsaw Railway Museum.
Type and origin
- Power type: Diesel
- Builder: (Soviet Union) Lyudinovo (Poland) Fablok
- Model: ТГМ3
- Build date: 1963-1966
- Total produced: 56
Specifications
- Configuration
  - UIC: B′B′
- Gauge: 1,435 mm (4 ft 8 1/2 in)
- Bogies: 2
- Length: 12,600 mm (500 in)
- Loco weight: 70 T
- Fuel consumption: 210 g/km
- Engine type: four-stroke
- Transmission: Hydraulic (Voith system)
Performance figures
- Maximum speed: 60 km/h
- Power output: 550 kW
Career
- Operators: PKP
- Class: (Poland) SM15 (Poland) Ls750H (Industry) (Poland) Ls750Hu (Industry)
- Number in class: 27 (PKP)
- Delivered: 1963

The SM15 (factory designation 12D) is a Polish diesel shunter used by PKP and industry — where it carried the designation Ls750H. It is based on the Soviet ТГМ3 (TGM3) locomotive.

== History ==
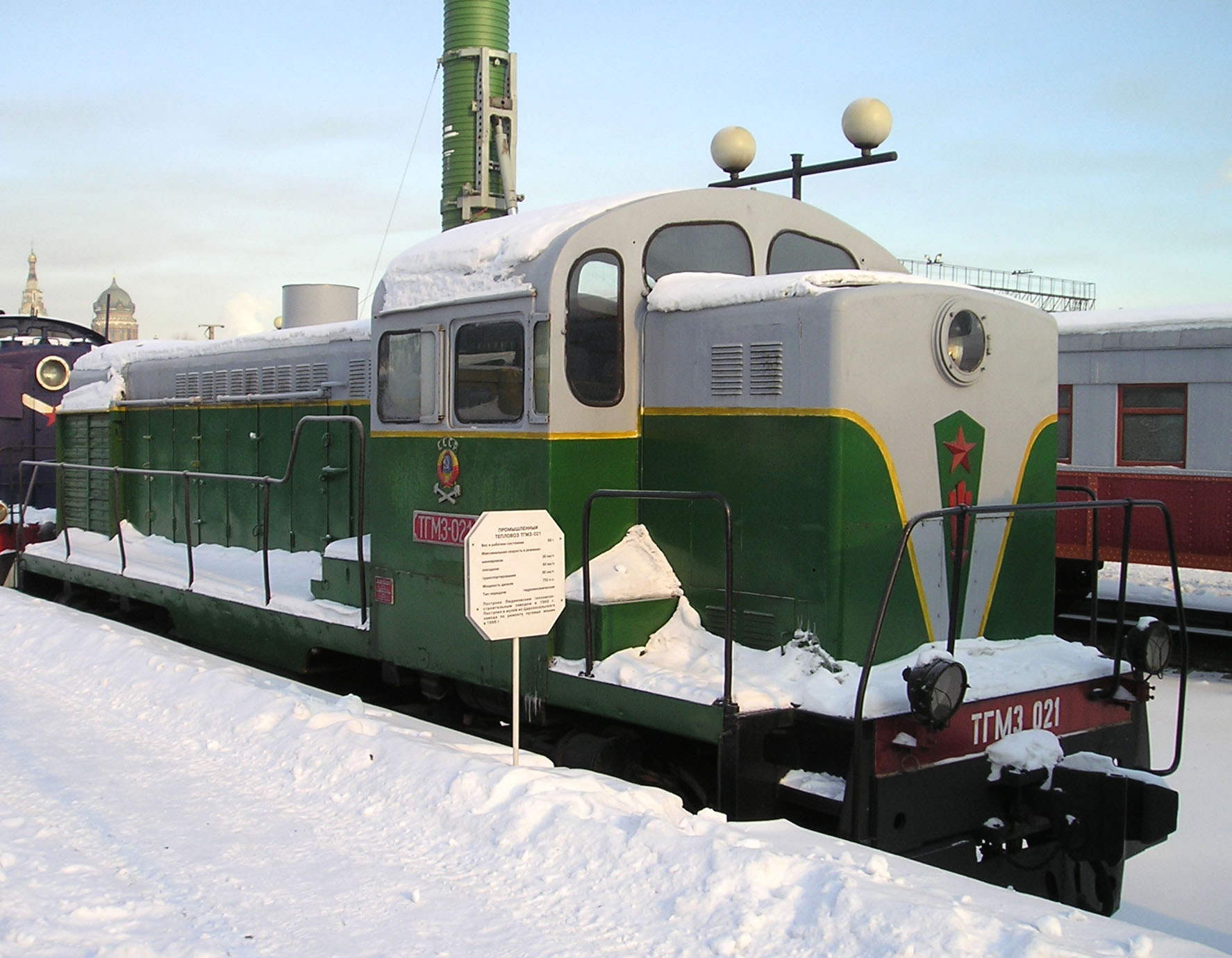
Soviet ТГМ3 locomotive — the predecessor of the SM15 — at the St. Petersburg Railway Museum.

Between the years 1963–1966, a total of 56 locomotives had been produced — 27 of which were used by PKP. Of the latter 27, the first two units (SM15-01 and SM15-02) were built at the Людиновский тепловозостроительный завод (en: Lyudinovo Diesel Locomotive Factory) and exported to Poland. Production then resumed at the Fablok factory in Chrzanów where the remaining 25 units, earmarked for PKP, were built.

The newly built SM15s were assigned to the depot in Kraków Płaszów, before being withdrawn from service in the late 1960s and early 1970s, when the SM42 series replaced them. Despite their relatively short operational history, the engineers who drove the locomotives remember them as being very powerful machines.

== Technical data ==
The SM15 is equipped with a Soviet 550 kW diesel engine (a number of SM15s had Polish V12CD9 engines installed, rather than the Soviet variant) with hydromechanical transmission. Certain models destined for use in industry had hydraulic transmission, and these carried the designation Ls750Hu. The SM15 is a B′B′ locomotive, which means that the unit runs on two bogies, with all axles powered.

The main reason behind the SM15's short operational lifespan was the unreliability of its transmission and power units.

== Preserved Units ==
Currently, there are three known examples of the SM15 in preservation:

- SM15-17 is an exhibit at the Warsaw Railway Museum
- SM15-22 has been kept back as a monument at the Technical Rail College in Tarnowskie Góry
