= Hüllhorst Comprehensive School =

Secondary school in North Rhine-Westphalia, Germany

- Gesamtschule Hüllhorst

Location
- Osterstraße 7 Gemeinde Hüllhorst, Kreis Minden - Lübbecke, North Rhine-Westphalia, 32609; Germany
- Coordinates: 52.27521°N 8.67263°E

Information
- Type: Secondary, comprehensive
- School number: 190081
- Director: Jörg Rümpel
- Staff: 95
- Grades: 5 - 13
- Gender: mixed
- Website: ges-huellhorst.de

Hüllhorst Comprehensive School is located in Hüllhorst, Nordrhein-Westfalen, Germany, and has about 1,250 pupils on roll. The school's staff includes over 95 teachers. In addition to their normal names, all classes from grade 5 to 10 are also named after a tree or bush of the Central European area which can be found on the school grounds as well.

The school's catchment includes Ahlsen, Büttendorf, Bröderhausen, Holsen, Hüllhorst, Huchzen, Oberbauerschaft, Schnathorst, Tengern and Lübbecke.

== Partner ==
Partners of Hüllhorst Comprehensive School are the education and culture lifelong learning programme "COMENIUS" and "AUBI-plus".
