= PKP class SM25 =

SM25
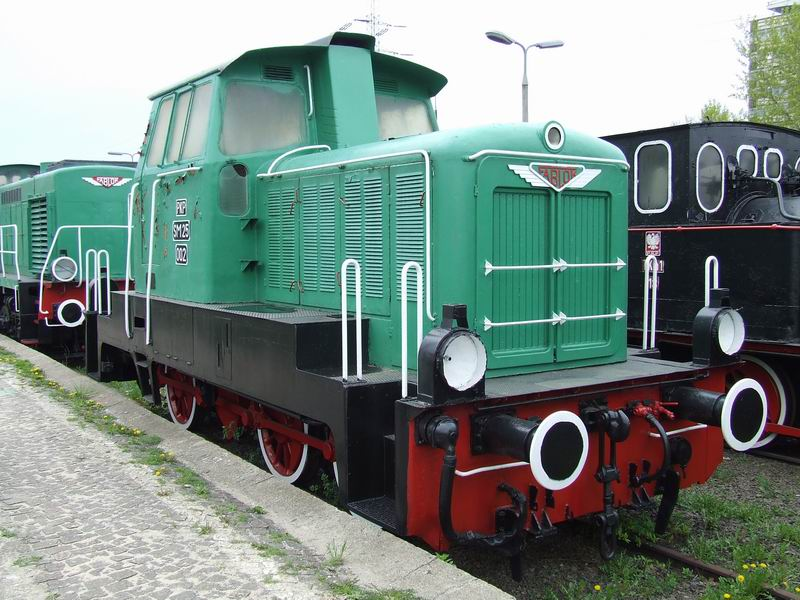
- SM25-002 at the Warsaw Railway Museum.
Type and origin
- Power type: Diesel
- Builder: (Poland) Fablok
- Model: 9D350
- Build date: 1961-1963
- Total produced: 3
Specifications
- Configuration
  - AAR: C
- Gauge: 1,435 mm (4 ft 8 1/2 in)
- Wheel diameter: 1,100 mm
- Length: 8,644 mm
- Width: 3,150 mm
- Loco weight: 70 T
- Fuel capacity: 920 kg
- Prime mover: Wola 1DVSa/31-350
- Engine type: four-stroke
- Transmission: hydraulic (Voith L26 system)
- Loco brake: Oerlikon hand brake
Performance figures
- Maximum speed: 60 km/h
- Power output: 257 kW
Career
- Operators: PKP
- Class: (Poland) SM25
- Number in class: 27 (PKP)
- Delivered: 1961

The SM25 (factory designation 9D350) is a Polish series of diesel shunter used by PKP.

== History ==
Plans for a locomotive with Voith hydraulic transmission (the first of its kind in Poland) were drawn up between the years of 1959 and 1960, alongside the design for the SN80 DMU — though the latter did not make use of the Voith system. The new locomotives were intended to replace the obsolete SM30 series — however, the SM30 was still being built long after production of the SM25 had ceased.

Manufacture of the SM25 began in 1961 and came to an end in 1963. During these years only three units rolled off the Fablok production line in Chrzanów, due to the severe difficulty in importing the hydraulic transmission units from Voith.

The three that were built were sent to the depot in Kraków where they remained in service until the late-1970s when they were sold to industry.

One example — SM25-002 (serial number 5427), built in 1962 — has been preserved as an exhibit at the Warsaw Railway Museum.

== Technical data ==
The SM25 is a C locomotive. This means that there are three powered axles under the unit. They are not articulated relative to other parts of the locomotive and are driven via hydraulic transmission. The locomotive is powered by a four-stroke diesel engine. The SM25 had several improvements over previous classes in the SM series. The most notable being the revised positioning of the cab — which had been soundproofed — and platforms, with the intent of providing optimal conditions for shunting.

== See also ==
- Polish locomotives designation
