= Prussian T 12 =

Class of 1014 German 2-6-0T locomotives

T 12 (Prussia, Alsace-Lorraine) DRG Class 74.4–13 ÖBB 674, PKP OKi2 SNCB/NMBS type 96
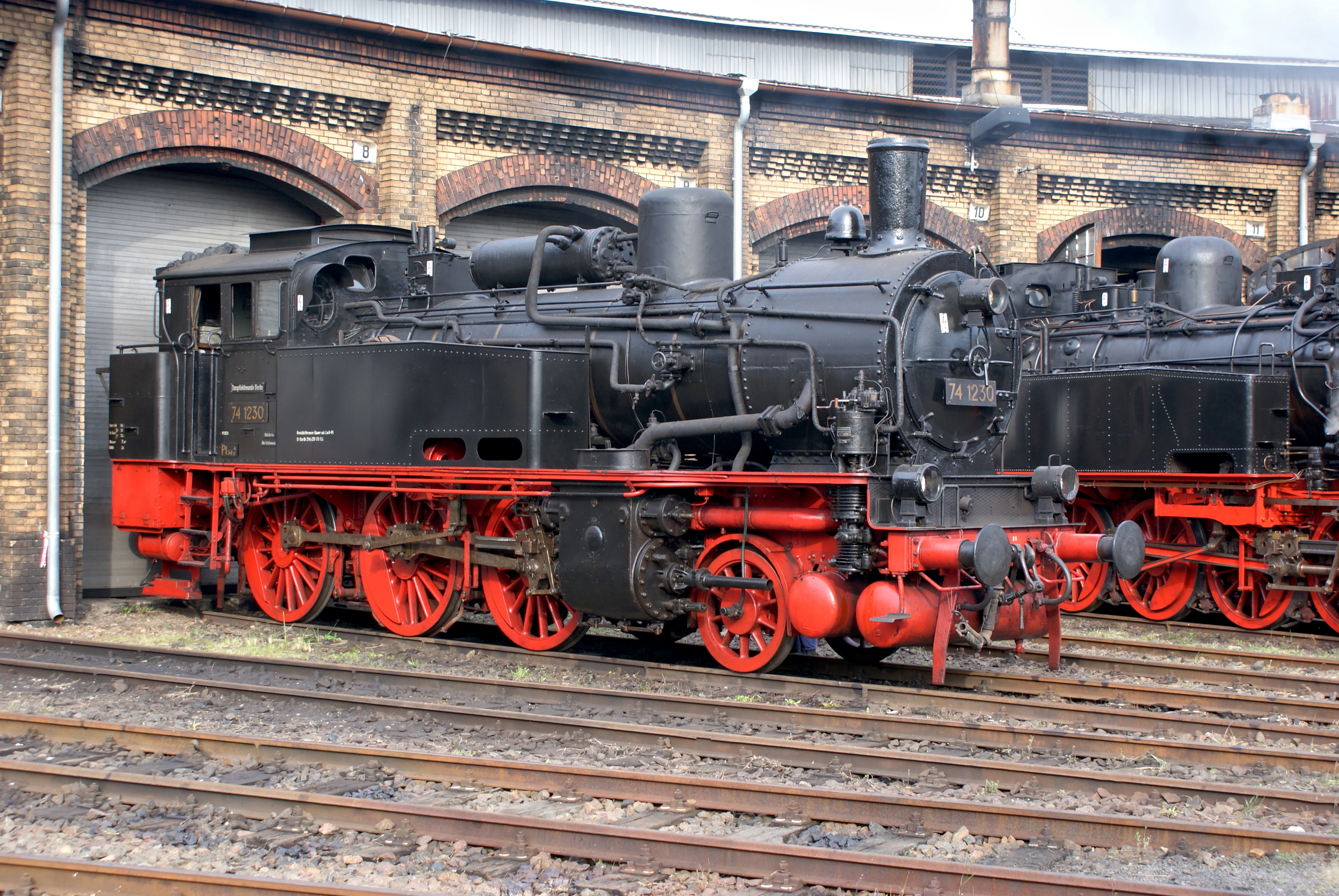
Type and origin
- Builder: Union Gießerei; Borsig; Hohenzollern; Grafenstaden
- Build date: 1902–1921
- Total produced: 1,014
Specifications
- Configuration
  - Whyte: 2-6-0T
  - German: Pt 34.17
- Gauge: 1,435 mm (4 ft 8 1/2 in)
- Leading dia.: 1,000 mm (3 ft 3 3/8 in)
- Driver dia.: 1,500 mm (4 ft 11 in)
- Length
  - Over beams: 11,800 mm (38 ft 8 1/2 in); 12,100 mm (39 ft 8 1/2 in)
- Axle load: 17.36 tonnes (17.09 long tons; 19.14 short tons)
- Adhesive weight: 50.50 tonnes (49.70 long tons; 55.67 short tons)
- Service weight: 65.90 tonnes (64.86 long tons; 72.64 short tons)
- Boiler pressure: 12 bar (1.20 MPa; 174 psi)
- Heating surface
  - Firebox: 1.69 m^{2} (18.2 sq ft)
  - Evaporative: 105.37 m^{2} (1,134.2 sq ft)
- Superheater
  - Heating area: 33.40 m^{2} (359.5 sq ft)
- Cylinder size: 540 mm (21 1/4 in)
- Piston stroke: 630 mm (24 13/16 in)
Performance figures
- Maximum speed: 80 km/h (50 mph)
- Indicated power: 640–669 kW (870–910 PS; 858–897 hp)
Career
- Numbers: DRG 74 401–543, 545–1321
- Retired: 1968

The Prussian Class T 12 were early German passenger tank locomotives built for the Prussian state railways in large numbers. These locomotives were superheated variants of the T 11.

== History ==
Although the T 12 first appeared as early as 1902 in an experimental guise, series production did not start until 1905. Besides the Prussian state railways, the engine was also procured by the Imperial Railways in Alsace-Lorraine (25 units), the Lübeck-Büchen Railway, and the Halberstadt-Blankenburg Railway.

The main sphere of operations for the T 12 was the Berlin area, where it worked the city network, ring railway, and suburban lines as a predecessor of electric S-Bahn traction. The engines had to be capable of rapid acceleration when in charge of compartment coach trains in order to achieve acceptable journey times, due to the short distances between stations on some routes. The T 12 was therefore a very powerful locomotive with strong acceleration in both running directions. In 1921 a follow-on order of 40 locomotives was built by Borsig, because the fleet was not large enough. After the electrification of much of the S-Bahn network between 1924 and 1929, the locomotives were switched to normal passenger and goods train services and shunting.

In 1925 the Reichsbahn took over 899 examples as their DRG Class 74.4-13 with numbers 74 401 to 74 1300 (74 544 was not used). The locomotives, for which this number was intended, had to be given to the Belgian state railways. Locomotives 74 784–786 and 74 784–786 and 74 1254 originally came from the Imperial Railways in Alsace-Lorraine. In 1935, ten Saarland Railways engines, with numbers 7701–7710, were taken over and renumbered 74 1301 to 74 1310.

Another eleven units, with numbers 74 1311 to 74 1321 were acquired from the Lübeck-Büchen Railway in 1938, where they had had running numbers 132 to 142. Five of them were streamlined like the 1'B1' streamliners. The streamlining was removed again in 1948; these engines could still be recognised from their tapered coal tanks.

30 locomotives were allocated to Belgium as part of the Treaty of Versailles. The Belgian State Railways got 27 engines and classified them as type 96 . The remaining 3 were given to the Compagnie du Nord–Belge and numbered 91-93 . The 3 locomotives were taken over by the SNCB/NMBS after the Nord-Belge was nationalised at the outbreak of WW2 in Belgium.

Locomotive 74 498 remained in Austria after the end of the Second World War where the ÖBB classed it as 674.498 in its tractive fleet. The engine was later employed in Vienna, was derailed on 3 July 1954 and then scrapped (official retirement date: 23 May 1955).

In 1950 the East German Deutsche Reichsbahn took over four of the locomotives bought by the Halberstadt-Blankenburg Railway, numbering them 74 6776–6779. The ex-Prussian Class T 12's were retired by both West and East German administrations by 1968.

Number 74 1192 (see photograph) has been preserved, along with no. 74 1230 and one of the PKP Class OKi2 in Poland (formerly 74 1234).

== See also ==
- Prussian state railways
- List of Prussian locomotives and railbuses
