= Großes Torfmoor =

Raised bog in Germany

Coordinates: 52°20′N 8°42′E

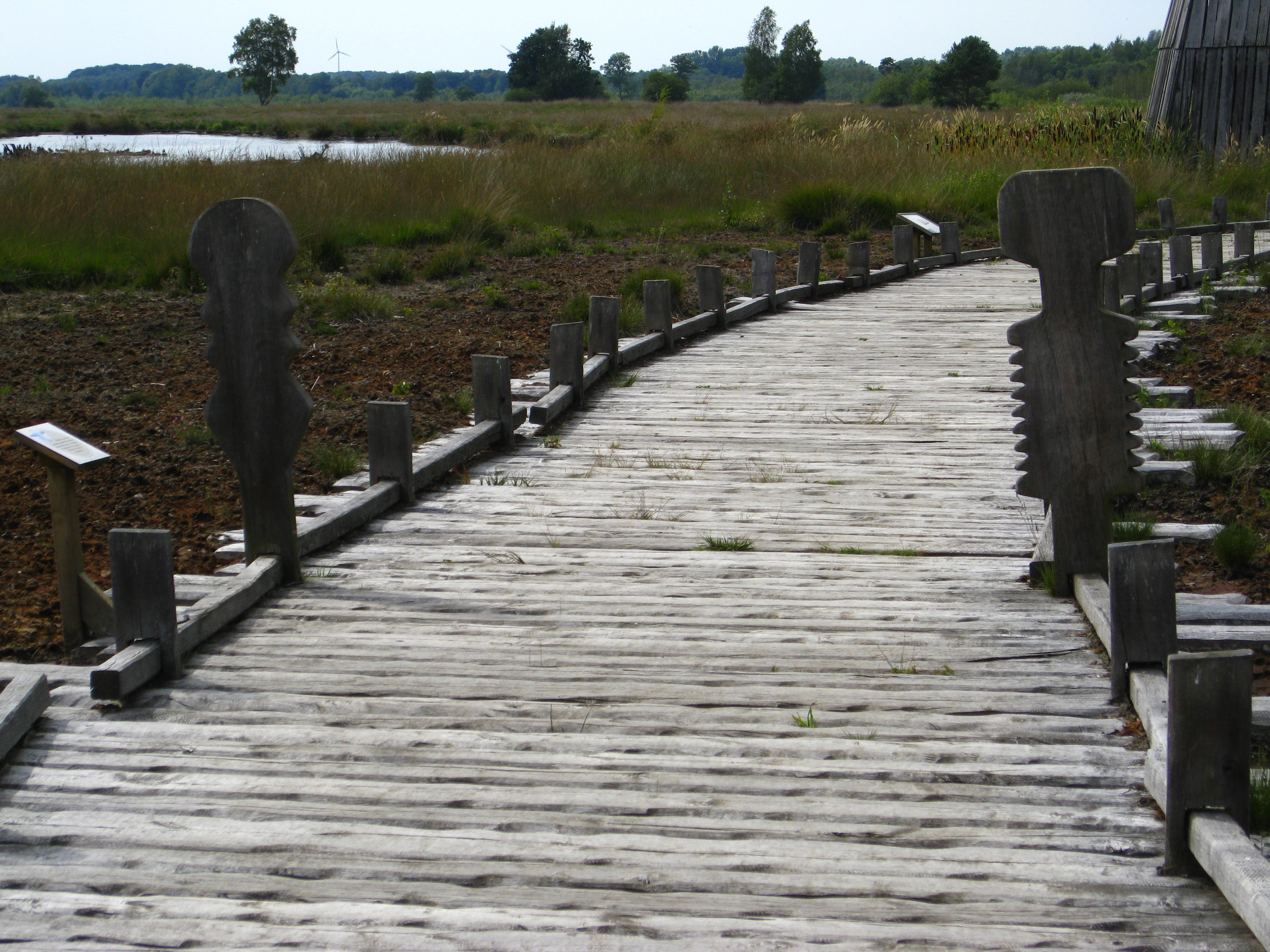
A bridge on the Großes Torfmoor

The Großes Torfmoor (also called the Hiller Moor or Nettelstedter Moor) is a raised bog located in the northeast of the state of North Rhine-Westphalia (in the district of Minden-Lübbecke) in Germany south of the Mittelland Canal. It is between the town of Lübbecke and the community of Hille. The bog is a nature reserve and is under special protection from the European Union because of the bird species living there.

== The LIFE-Nature project ==
€1,800,000 have been spent since 2003 towards the regeneration of the bog by the LIFE-Nature project. The project has also installed 14 km of new nature trails, which include informational panels that guide visitors and explain the history of and future plans for the bog.
