= Petershagen =

- Town
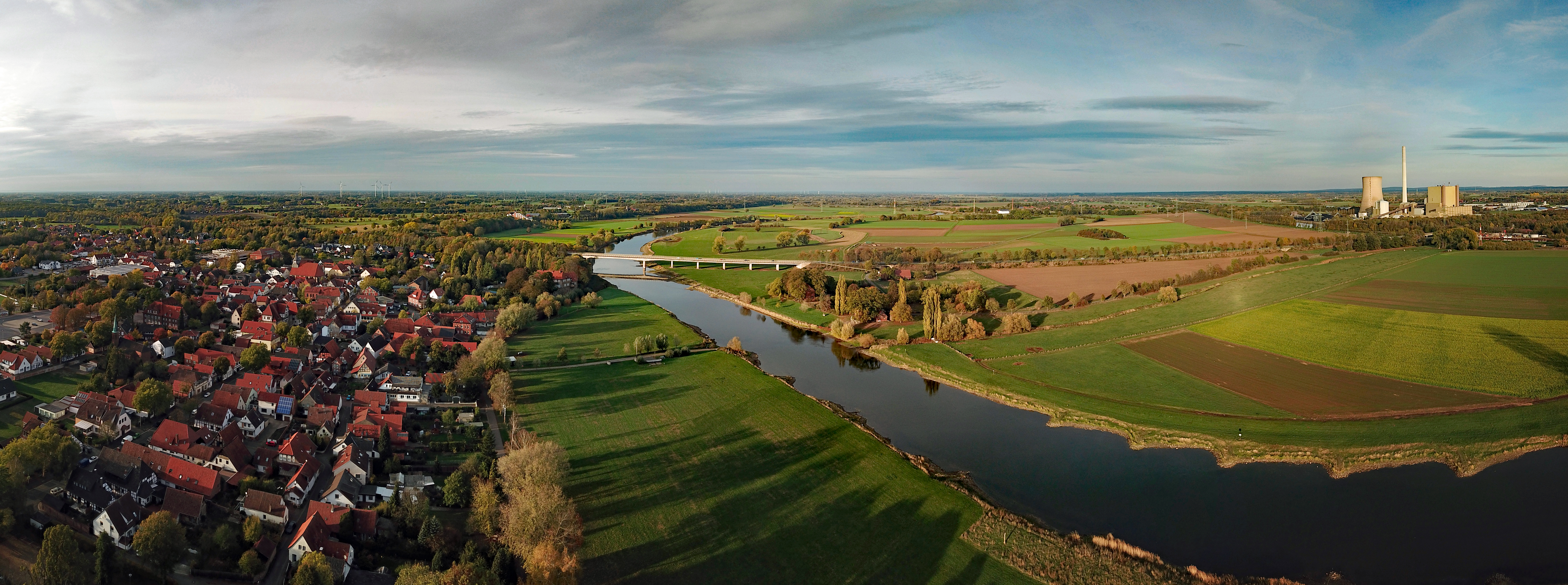
- Aerial view of Petershagen

- Flag Coat of arms

- Location of Petershagen within Minden-Lübbecke district
- Interactive map of Petershagen
- Location within Germany Location within North Rhine-Westphalia
- Coordinates: 52°23′N 8°58′E
- Country: Germany
- State: North Rhine-Westphalia
- Admin. region: Detmold
- District: Minden-Lübbecke
- Subdivisions: 29

Government
  - Mayor (2020–25): Dirk Breves (CDU)

Area
  - Total: 211.94 km^{2} (81.83 sq mi)
- Elevation: 41 m (135 ft)

Population (2025-12-31)
  - Total: 25,192
  - Density: 118.86/km^{2} (307.86/sq mi)
- Time zone: UTC+01:00 (CET)
  - Summer (DST): UTC+02:00 (CEST)
- Postal codes: 32469
- Dialling codes: 05707
- Vehicle registration: MI
- Website: www.petershagen.de

Petershagen (German pronunciation: [ˌpeːtɐsˈhaːɡn̩]; Low German: Päitershaugen) is a town in the Minden-Lübbecke district, in North Rhine-Westphalia, Germany. It lies on the Westphalian Mill Route. The core is formed by the districts of Petershagen and Lahde, located opposite each other on the Weser. Its typical dialect belongs, as with the Bremer Platt to the Southern Oldenburgish variety Northern Low Saxon, itself a dialect of the Low German language.

== Geography ==
Petershagen is situated on the river Weser, approx. 10 km north-east of Minden.

=== Neighbouring municipalities ===
- Minden
- Hille
- Uchte
- Stolzenau
- Leese
- Landesbergen
- Loccum
- Rehburg-Loccum
- Nienburg
- Niedernwöhren
- Bückeburg

=== Division of the town ===
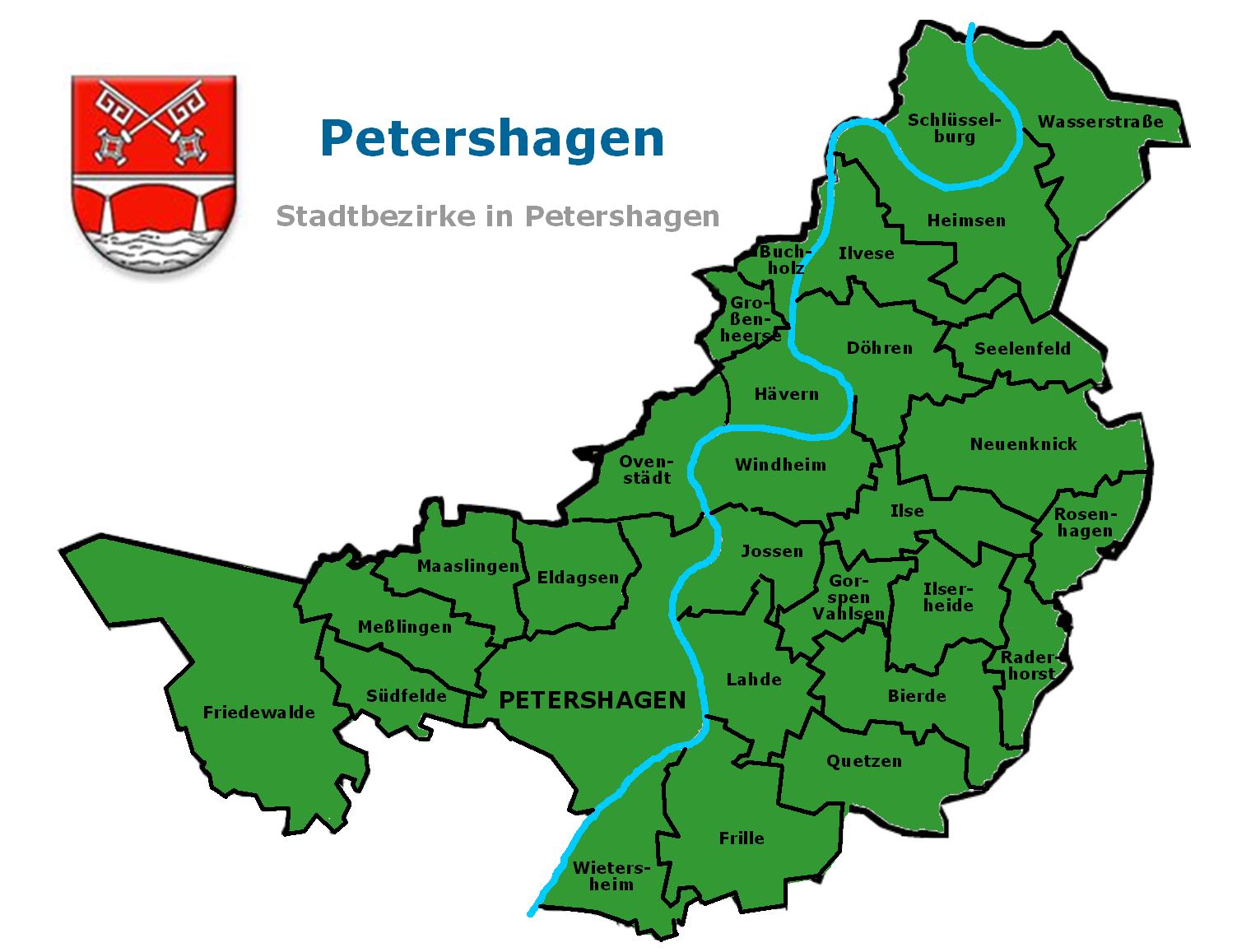
Divisions of Petershagen

The town of Petershagen consists of 29 districts:

- Bierde
- Buchholz
- Döhren
- Eldagsen
- Friedewalde
- Frille
- Gorspen-Vahlsen
- Großenheerse
- Hävern
- Heimsen
- Ilse
- Ilserheide
- Ilvese
- Jössen
- Petershagen-Lahde
- Maaslingen
- Meßlingen
- Neuenknick
- Ovenstädt
- Petershagen (city center)
- Quetzen
- Raderhorst
- Rosenhagen
- Schlüsselburg
- Seelenfeld
- Südfelde
- Wasserstraße
- Wietersheim
- Windheim

== Population ==
Historical population

Year	Pop.	±% p.a.
1965	24,787	—
1970	24,474	−0.25%
1975	24,415	−0.05%
1980	24,061	−0.29%
1985	23,466	−0.50%
1990	24,543	+0.90%
1995	26,142	+1.27%

Year	Pop.	±% p.a.
2000	27,040	+0.68%
2005	26,882	−0.12%
2010	25,750	−0.86%
2015	25,663	−0.07%
2020	25,045	−0.49%
2025	25,192	+0.12%

Source: Landesdatabank Nordrhein-Westfalen

== International relations ==
Petershagen is twinned with:

- Petershagen-Eggersdorf (Brandenburg, Germany) -- since 1990

== Sport ==
The SC Neuenknick e.V. motorcycle speedway club, race at the Stadion Lindenau track, which is located approximately 12 kilometres north east of the town on Brennwisk 40. The facility, a 357 metre track, has hosted important events since 1981, including qualifying rounds of the Speedway World Championship in 1988.

== Notable people ==
The following persons were born in Petershagen:

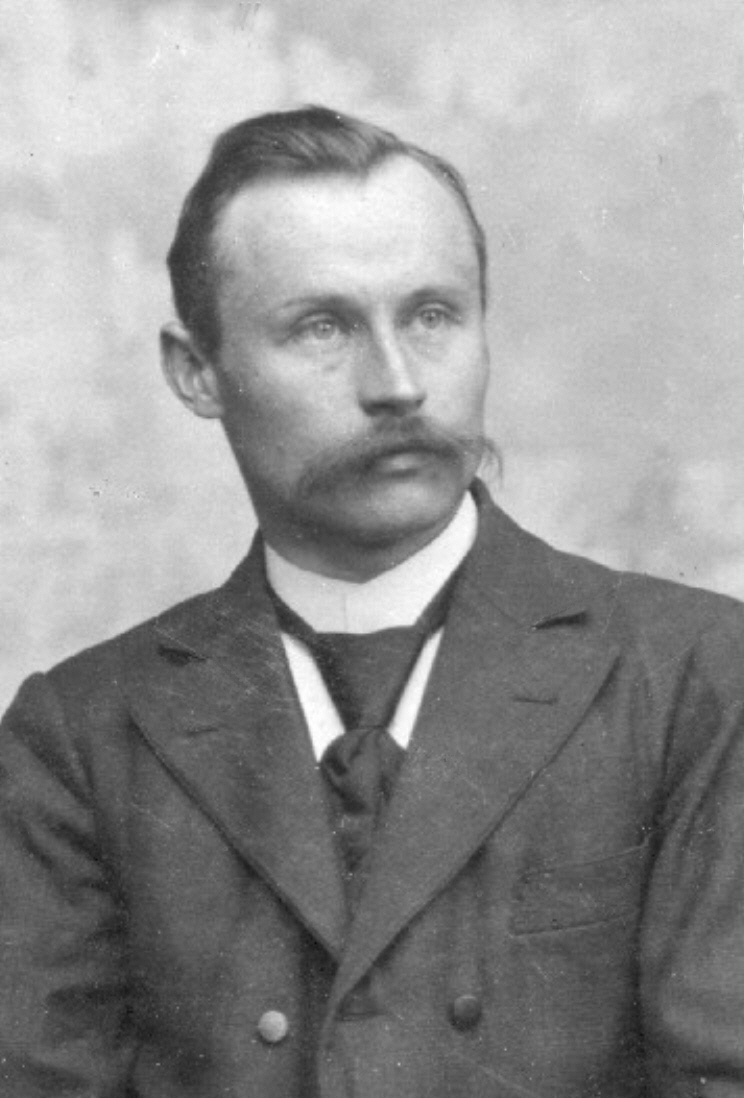
Wilhelm Normann in 1905

- Master Bertram (c. 1345 – c. 1415), painter (presumably born in Bierde)
- Johann Friedrich Wilhelm Herbst (1743–1807), natural scientist
- Johann Karl Ludwig Gieseler (1792–1854), Professor of Church History
- Henry Clay Brockmeyer (1826–1906), politician and translator of Hegel
- August Fick (1833–1916), Germanist and linguist
- Fred Walsen (1841-1906), American banker and Colorado State Treasurer
- Wilhelm Normann (1870–1939), inventor of fat hardening and thus the founder of margarine production
- Elsbeth Schragmüller (1887–1940), spy
- Edelgard Bulmahn (born 1951), politician
- Willi Brase (born 1951), politician
