= Hille, Germany =

Hille
- Town
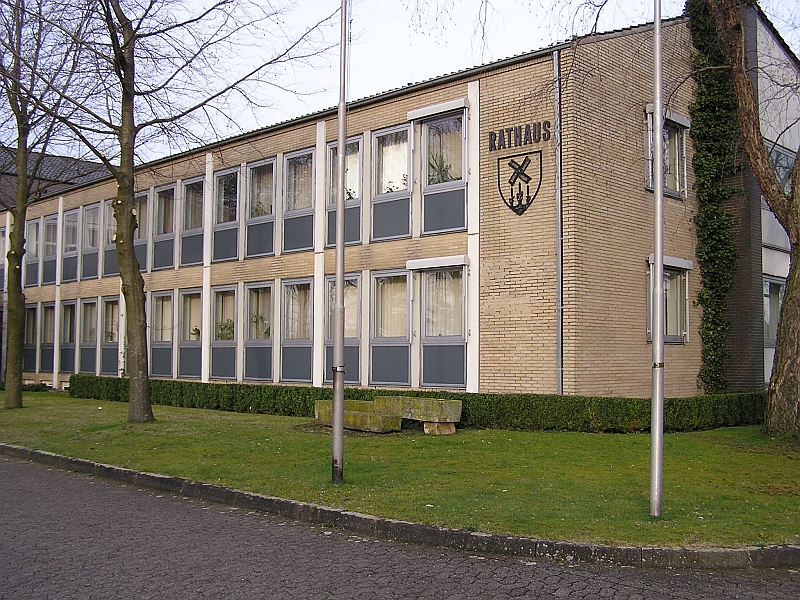
- Town hall

- Flag Coat of arms

- Location of Hille within Minden-Lübbecke district
- Interactive map of Hille
- Location within Germany Location within North Rhine-Westphalia
- Coordinates: 52°19′59″N 08°45′00″E
- Country: Germany
- State: North Rhine-Westphalia
- Admin. region: Detmold
- District: Minden-Lübbecke
- Subdivisions: 9

Government
  - Mayor (2025–30): Andreas Waßmann (Ind.)

Area
  - Total: 102.99 km^{2} (39.76 sq mi)
- Elevation: 45–251 m (148–823 ft)

Population (2025-12-31)
  - Total: 16,242
  - Density: 157.70/km^{2} (408.45/sq mi)
- Time zone: UTC+01:00 (CET)
  - Summer (DST): UTC+02:00 (CEST)
- Postal codes: 32470–32479
- Dialling codes: 05703
- Vehicle registration: MI
- Website: www.hille.de

Hille (German pronunciation: [ˈhɪlə]) is a community in the Kreis Minden-Lübbecke in the north of East Westphalia, Germany, with approximately 16,000 inhabitants. It was created in 1973 in the framework of the community restructuring of North Rhine-Westphalia through the combining of nine communities of the Minden countryside. The community is named after Hille its largest village. The geography of the community belongs to that of the North German Plain, from its lowest altitude of 45 metres it rises to 251 metres on the ridge of the Wiehengebirge at its southern border.

== Geography ==
Hille is located in the northeast of the Detmold (region), in the middle of the Minden Land. Hille has portions of the ecologic areas of the Wiehen Hills, the Lübbecke Loess Country and the Rahden-Diepenauer Sandy Moorlands (boglands). The southern portion of the community is located in the transition zone from the North Germain Plain to the Central Uplands (piedmont). This especially apparent with the ridgelike structure of the Wiehengebirge, which closes Hille like a bolt from the Ravensberg hill country. The main part of the northerly bench of the community is clearly a component of the plain, which received its endmoraine character from the Ice Age. The Great Peatbog (Grosses Torfmoor) provides Hille with a wet ecosystem of glacial origin which has been a designated nature reserve since 1980. This is where rare plants and animals such as white storks are found. Hille is the source of the Ösper, a tributary of the River Weser. The Mittelland Canal crosses Hille at its geographic middle in an east–west orientation. Several settlements adhere to the canal's adjacent dry northern plateau. To the north are a large raised bog and the Minden Forest (Mindener Wald). The River Weser presents a geographic border 10 km east of Hille. To the west the same landscape continues all the way to Osnabrück. The varied farmland is characterized by scattered settlements and single farms that are bordered by copses and hedges. Forests are found on higher ground, while meadows are found at low ground and in bogs.

=== Neighbouring municipalities ===
- Petershagen
- Minden
- Bad Oeynhausen
- Hüllhorst
- Lübbecke
- Espelkamp
- Uchte in Lower Saxony

=== Subdivisions of the municipality ===
After the local government reforms of 1973, Hille consists of 9 districts:

- Hille-Dorf
- Hartum
- Nordhemmern
- Holzhausen II
- Südhemmern
- Eickhorst
- Rothenuffeln
- Oberlübbe
- Unterlübbe

=== Geology ===
The community land formation was primary influenced by the Saalian Stage (Wolstonian Stage and Illinoian Stage are Equivalents) ice age, as well as pre and post glacial process. At the time the area was covered with ice, the flow of water had an opposite direction to that of the present, that is it flowed from the ice to the south, collected in a riverine environment north of the Wiehengebirge and flowed to the west to reach the sea. Extensive wet bogs were created in this historic river valley, that remained impassable for humans for a long time. Remains of this exist in the Great Peat Bog (Große Torfmoor) that is now a protected nature preserve.

=== Soils ===
The mentioned glacial conditions created various fertilities of soil, with varying impact on the structure of settlement. As a result, there is fertile soil in the south between the Wiehengebirge and the Bastau lowland, which is referred to as Lübbecke Loessland. Besides the settlement of Rothenuffeln, the villages of Oberlübbe, Unterlübbe and Eickhorst developed here. The Bastau lowland connects to the north, in which there can be no significant agriculture. Because of this the Mittellandkanal is located at its northern edge. The Hartume loess plate lies to the Northeast of the Bastau lowland, where there are good opportunities for agriculture. The villages of Hartum, Nordhemmern, Südhemmern and Holzhausen II are located here. The farmsteads are of middling size with 100 morgen(1 morgen = 3 acres) not being uncommon. This loess plate continues to the westward beyond the stream Flöthe, where the village of Hille is the center of settlement. The northeast of the community of Hille has poor soil that allows only forestry( Mindener Wald) to exist.

=== Fauna ===
The white stork nests in and around the Bastau lowland, with assistance provided for its recovering population.

=== Extent and utilization of the Community Area ===
Hille is classified as a "large rural community" that lies in the North German Plain, it rises to the ridge of the Wiehengebirge in the south. The Lübber Berg (mountain) is its highest point at an altitude of 251m over sea level. The lowest point is in the Bastau lowland meadows or bogs near Hartum with an altitude of only 47.7m. Hille extends 11.8 km from east to west and 15.4 km from north to south.

Area by Utilization	Agriculture- Area	Forest- Area	Building-, Open- and Commerce Area	Transportation- Area	Water- Area	Sport- and Greenspace Area	Other- Use
Area in km^{2}	76.05	7.76	8.82	6.31	2.25	0.65	1.15
Part of Total Area	73.84%	7.53%	8.56%	6.13%	2.18%	0.63%	1.12%

== History ==
Hille was and is influenced by its agricultural character. Besides the large farms, which grew because of the good loess soil of the Hartumer Loess Plate, there were many small homes for contract workers into the 19th century. The contract workers earned a supplemental income through manual labor such as the weaving of linen. Cigarmaking arrived in Hille at the end of the 19th century. Especially toward the end of the 19th century many residents of the Hille villages emigrated to the USA. Their goal was mostly the state of New York and especially the city of Schenectady. Men from Hille also travelled by foot to the Netherlands for seasonal work such as mowing grass. Many of them remained there.

Around the middle of the 19th century, the transportation infrastructure became significantly enhanced by road construction under the leadership of Carl von Schlotheim who was Land Councilor in the Prussian Kreis Minden. While the primary goal of this program was job creation, it served to boost the economy of the Kreis. The railroad reached this rural region in the early 20th century. The Mindener Kreisbahnen opened a stretch of narrow gauge line to Eickhorst in 1903. The line was extended to Lübbecke in 1907. It was converted to standard gauge at a later time. The objective of this Prussian improvement was rural area development: transport of chemical fertilizer, transport of agricultural products to Minden and Lübbecke and further transport from there to other cities by the State railway. The construction of the Mindener Kreisbahn was also a good job creator, with thousands of workers earning their bread and keep. The stretch from Hille to Lübbecke was shut down in 1967 and subsequently demolished. Freight service still exists between the harbour at the village of Hille and the city of Minden. Even Oberlübbe had a narrow gauge railway connection from 1897 to 1937. The so-called "Wallücker Willem" connected the quarry mine near Wallücke in the Wiehengebirge with Löhne and Kirchlengern to the south. It transported passengers as well as iron ore over the mountain ridge.

Hiller Platt, a dialect of Low German, was spoken by most residents into recent times. It had considerable variation from village to village. The use of this language has declined significantly.

== Community restructuring ==
The larger community of Hille was created on January 1, 1973, as a response to the Bielefeld-Gezetz(law) in the framework of the community reform of North Rhine-Westfalia. This united the heretofore independent communities of Eickhorst, Hartum, Hille, Holzhausen II, Nordhemmern und Südhemmern from the old Amt Hartum as well as the communities of Oberlübbe, Rothenuffeln und Unterlübbe from the old Amt Dützen. In contrast several peripheral sections of Holzhausen II and Hartum were shifted to the city of Minden while corridor sections of the old community Hahlen were added to larger Hille. Amt Hartum and Amt Dützen were dissolved; the community of Hille is the legal successor of Amt Hartum. The community town hall is the building formerly housing Amt Hartum, which has a reasonably accessible location to the larger community.

== Demographics ==
The following overview shows the population of the community of Hille according to the contemporary extent of borders.

Historical population

Year	Pop.	±% p.a.
1950	15,734	—
1961	14,520	−0.73%
1965	14,698	+0.31%
1970	14,785	+0.12%
1975	14,499	−0.39%
1980	14,136	−0.51%
1985	13,964	−0.24%
1990	14,727	+1.07%

Year	Pop.	±% p.a.
1995	15,857	+1.49%
2000	16,571	+0.88%
2005	16,554	−0.02%
2010	16,167	−0.47%
2015	15,916	−0.31%
2020	15,378	−0.69%
2025	16,242	+1.10%

Source: Landesdatabank Nordrhein-Westfalen (1965-2025)

=== Religion ===
All villages in Hille became Lutheran with the introduction of the Reformation along with the city of Minden in 1550. The parishes exist to the present day. When the area was ceded to Prussia, the regional church became the Evangelical Church in Prussia in 1817 (Evangelical Church of Westphalia since 1945), which considers itself united in administration, that is to say comprising Lutheran, Reformed and congregations of united belief. The parishes are now partly combined with one parish serving several villages. A part of the old church owned buildings was transferred to other uses and replaced by newer buildings, for example the parsonage of the village of Hille. The acceptance of the refugees of World War II resulted in the formation of Catholic parishes, which is slowly changing the milieu to one of multiple beliefs.

== Governance ==
=== Community Council (Gemeinderat) ===
Since the community elections of 1999 the town council of Hille has 32 seats besides the mayor. The representatives of the FWG Party and the Green Party(Grünen)have joined into one coalition.

The members of the community council are elected for a term of 5 years. The next election will take place in 2014. Until the community elections of 1999, the office of mayor was honorary but was a member of the community council, with a Community Administrator (Gemeindedirector) leading the community administration.

The following table shows the community election results since 1975:

	2009		2004		1999		1994		1989		1984		1979		1975	
Party	Seats	%	Seats	%	Seats	%	Seats	%	Seats	%	Seats	%	Seats	%	Seats	%
CDU	12	39.76	15	45.14	14	44.74	12	37.81	n/v	32.35	n/v	41.10	n/v	42.01	n/v	41.03
SPD	12	36.73	11	35.15	12	35.81	14	41.85	n/v	44.63	n/v	39.27	n/v	38.83	n/v	39.83
FDP	4	12.89	3	10.52	3	10.19	3	8.41	n/v	9.80	n/v	10.99	n/v	17.17	n/v	19.13
FWG ^{1}	2	5.87	2	4.74	2	5.18	2	5.85	n/v	n/v	n/v	n/v	n/v	n/v	n/v	n/v
Grüne	2	4.84	1	4.45	1	4.08	2	6.08	n/v	4.72	n/v	6,54	-	-	-	-
Sonstige ^{2}	-	-	-	-	-	-	-	-	n/v	8.50	n/v	2.09	n/v	1.99	-	-
Total ^{3}	32	100	32	100	32	100	33	100	n/v	100	n/v	100	n/v	100	n/v	100
Election Participation	67.15		68.44		66.36		85.13		75.56		78.73		82.65		88.84	

=== Mayor (Bürgermeister) ===
1973–1979	Walter Rohde (FDP)
1979–1989	Kurt Riechmann (CDU / heute FWG)
1989–1999	Günter Grannemann (SPD)
1999–2008	Reinhard Jasper (CDU)
2009–	Michael Schweiß (SPD)

The former Community Administrator (Gemeindedirector) Reinhard Jasper was elected mayor in a 1999 runoff election with 52.44% of the vote versus Friedrich Meyer of the SPD Party. He succeeded former mayor Günter Grannemann (SPD). In the 2004 Community election, Reinhard Jasper was re-elected on the first ballot against the First Councilmember Klaus-Herman Pörtner (SPD) with 53.88% of the vote. Reinhard Jasper retired from his duties as mayor of Hille on September 30, 2008. He reached this decision in response to allegations that he had utilized community workers in his own home during their work-hours. The criminal court in Minden levied a fine of 9600 Euros against the mayor, which he has appealed. Since October 1, 2008 the administrative leadership has been provided by the mayoral representative, Helmut Spilker.

=== Community Administrators (Gemeindedirektoren) ===
Until 1999 the administration of the community of Hille was led by an executive community administrator, who was elected by the community council (Gemeinderat). Wilhelm Grote, the former Director of the dissolved Amt Hartum, was elected as the first community administrator in 1973. He fulfilled these duties until his retirement in 1987. Reinhard Jasper first won the office through the drawing of lots to break a tie in the vote.

=== Coat of Arms, Flag and Seal ===
Wappen der Gemeinde Hille

The community of Hille obtained the right to a coat of arms, a flag and a seal in 1981 from the Detmold Regional President. (Hauptsatzung § 2)

Description of the Coat of Arms: In Silver (White) out of a red wavy shield foot grow three red cat-tails with black cylinder above red diagonally oriented windmill blades.

The windmill blades derive from the coat of arms of the former Amt Hartum, which had many windmills in its territory. The cat-tails derive from the coat of arms of the former community of Hille, where the Hille Moor is located; and where the harvesting of peat was formerly of great significance. The use of red and silver harks back to the historic relationship to the Bishopric of Minden.

Description of the Flag: Red and white horizontally striped with the coat of arms extending from the middle to the flag pole.

Description of the Banner Red and white horizontally striped with the coat of arms extending from the middle to the top.

Description of the Seal: Script on top: GEMEINDE HILLE. Script underneath: KREIS MINDEN-LÜBBECKE. Seal Picture: Coat of Arms in which the content of the coat of arms is given in contours.

== Culture and sights ==
=== Windmills ===
Hille is a significant contributor to the Westfalian Mill Road in the so-called Mill(Muehlen) Kreis Minden-Lübbecke. Five examples of the Dutch type windmill are standing in the community. The windmill in Hartum has been gutted and converted to a vacation home. The windmills in Hille and Nordhemmern are functional, they are used to accommodate meetings of associations and groups. The windmill in Eickhorst is known as the Stork Mill and is operated by a group that conducts an open house every 3rd or 4th Saturday during the season. Eickhorst also has a water mill with a functioning water wheel. The related building was converted to a home. The windmill in Südhemmern has been built as a complete mill complex with the millers house and a community center. The mill cannot be operated presently since a miller is lacking. The Mindener Boat Excursion Line (Schifffahrtgesellschaft) offers a combination ticket to the Südhemmern windmill by boat on the Mittlelandkanal from Minden, with a return by the Museum Train (Museumseisenbahn)operating on the Mindener Kreisbahnen track.

=== Theater ===
There is no dedicated theater building in this rural community, but performances are presented intermittently in the assembly hall of the Combined School (Verbundschule) in the village of Hille. Two adjacent communities have created open air amphitheaters for amateur productions called Freilichtbühne Nettelstedt and Freilichtbühne Porta.

=== Museums ===
The "Heimathaus Hartum" demonstrates life and work of the "good old times" in a timbered farm-house that dates from 1872. The old jail for Amt Hartum also still stands in the village of Hartum. It is noteworthy that this building always had a double function, the other part housed the equipment of the fire brigade. There is a manual craft museum in Holzhausen II that is located next to the historic smithy. The Moorgalerie in Eickhorst contains a photography exhibit featuring scenes of the Great Peat Bog. The old distillery building in the village of Hille is no longer functional but provides an exhibit of the distillation process of "Hiller Moorbrand" a schnaps based liquor. It also contains an exhibit of agricultural work of 150 years ago, with many examples of agricultural utensils on the second floor.

=== Significant buildings ===
Besides its windmill every village had a village chapel or church at its core. The local style was determined by timber construction with fieldstone walls and tile roofs. The village of Hille contains the old distillery Meyer, a former distillery of rye mash. A stork nest was erected on its chimney. The family seat of the von Oenhausen family is a substantial part timbered house in the village of Hille that is familiarly referred to as "Reimlers Hof".

The village church in Hille dates from 1523, and was Catholic for a brief time before it became Evangelic-Lutheran in the Reformation. The building was renovated and expanded over time. The altar was endowed by the couple Oeynhausen/Pohlmann. It is located in the west and not the typical east part of the church. Renovation in 1954/1995 disclosed old ceiling paintings from 1523. Surrounding the church are tombstones from the old cemetery. A tombstone from the 16th century was located on the outer wall, shows Conrad von Aswede who was Canon in Minden. Equally noteworthy is the 600-year-old linden or lime tree that stands next to the church.

=== Parks und Nature Preserves ===
The Community of Hille possesses significant protected natural areas (Naturschutzgebiete) including "Naturschutzgebiet Großes Torfmoor", the "Naturschutzgebiet Bastauwiesen" and the Mindener Forest (Wald).

The old farmers spa Rothenuffeln with its sulphur springs has established itself on the north slope of the Wiehengebirge. It includes an old spa park that invites guests for hiking.

=== Sport ===
Hille and the surrounding area is a significant focus for German handball. This sport utilizes a ball smaller than a basketball, while scoring is against a goal that is smaller than that for soccer. The neighboring clubs TuS Nettelstedt-Lübbecke and Grün-Weiß Dankersen Minden play in the German major league, the Handball-Bundesliga. The renowned handball-players Dieter Waltke und Frank von Behren come from Hille and participated on the German national team. Every local sport club includes a handball component.

=== Scheduled events ===
The open Market in Hille has been held annually in April and September since 1564. The youth wind or brass orchestra performs during alternating years in the large spa park in Rothenuffeln to initiate its light show.

=== Culinary specialties ===
Much grain is grown in this area. A significant portion of this is converted to Korn (whiskey) or Moorbrand produced in Hille.

== Economy and infrastructure ==
=== Transportation ===
The infrastructure of Hille is greatly influenced by the east–west-oriented ridge of the Wiehengebirge as well as the Mittellandkanal, which runs in the same direction.

The B 65 Road from Hannover to Osnabrück runs through the southern part of the community. This national connector road was of more significance in the past; a part of its former mission has been superseded by the A 30 Autobahn located on the south side of the Wiehengebirge.

The closest railway stations are in Minden and Bad Oeynhausen on the main lines Bielefeld–Hannover and Osnabrück–Hannover as well as the railway station in Lübbecke on the Ravensberg Line. The individual villages are connected by regional and on-call buses with Minden, Lübbecke, Espelkamp and Bad Oeynhausen. Hille belongs to the transportation cooperative of OstWestfalenLippe. Freight trains and Museum trains traverse the lines of the Mindener Kreisbahnen. These tracks run from Hille to Minden's upper city (Oberstad).

Regular bus connections run to Lübbecke, Minden, Espelkamp und Rahden.

The important Mittellandkanal traverses the community since 1915. The Harbour of Hille is located on it and is connected to the Mindener Kreisbahn. Its cargo totals increased from 2005 to 2006.

Long distance bicycle trails like the Bremen–Bad Oeynhausen route, Mühlenroute und Wellness-Radroute traverse the community.

=== Local businesses ===
Agriculture has a strong influence on the area encompassing the community of Hille. Besides well functioning farms on loess soil there are many areas with poor soil and meager incomes. Many residents therefore depended on other work. This caused the linen industry to grow in the 18th century and the cigar industry in the 19th century. Work in the home was characteristic of both of them. The forests provided raw material for furniture manufacture, which however did not become as specialized locally as did the kitchen furnishing industry in the Ravensberg countryside.

An example of this is Friedrich Priess GmbH & Co KG, a furniture manufactures in Hille since 1931. the firm Prieß, Horstmann & Co. Maschinenbau, GmbH & Co.KG in Unterlübbe manufactures machine tools for the furniture industry.

The poor economic conditions in the post World War era caused many job searchers to travel to the Volkswagen works in Hannover. In those days workers employed at Volkswagen could purchase a car annually and resell it. This resulted in an active used-car trade for the area.

The trash landfill Pohlsche Heide is located in Hille, which handles provides trash disposal beyond the Kreis Minden-Lübbecke.

The R. Bücker EDV-Beratung Datentechnik GmbH is a medium-sized data supply IT Company from Hille. The UPHOFF Schlosserei GmbH is involved in steel construction and machine manufacture with 20 workers in Hille. The dtH Tiemann GmbH builds windows in Hille. ESKATE Rohrverbindungstechnik GmbH is located in Unterlübbe and specializes in flange and swage connections, as well as special bent products. Rhenus GmbH is a freight transport firm located at the harbour in Hille.

The Wiehengebirgsmolkerei is a dairy located in Unterlübbe.

=== Media ===
The printed media for Hille originates primarily from the city of Minden. This is the locale of the daily newspaper Mindener Tageblatt, which has a page dedicated to Hille. The radio station Westdeutscher Rundfunk is regarded as the state(Land) radio station. The WDR TV and radio studio in Bielefeld produces programs focused on East Westfalia (Ostwestfalen). Commercial competition is provided by Radio Westfalica from Minden, whose local viewpoint is being strengthened.

=== Public organizations ===
The voluntary fire fighting brigade for Hille consists of 9 independent pump groups, which are located in the 9 villages of the community.

Hospital services are provided at the Kreis level. The closed hospitals are located in Minden, Lübbecke und Rahden. The newly constructed Johannes-Wesling-Klinikum opened in 2008.

The German Red Cross has the Deutsche Rote Kreuz Ortsverein Hille e.V. to provide non-police emergency services.

=== Education ===
For a long time, each of the villages had its own schools in which multiple age groups were taught together. Classes by yearly grade were introduced after the end of WWII and the accompanying population growth. The subsequent ongoing decline in the birth rate no longer allowed the continuation of the system and led to consolidation. Subsequently, each village no longer had its own schools, and school children were forced to use a school-bus. Hille, Nordhemmern, Oberlübbe and Rothenuffeln are the only villages to retain grade schools.

The establishment of the Community Hille created the desire to provide more advance schools; it was the previous norm that advanced scholars commuted to higher schools in Minden or Lübbecke. In the 1950 a combined school with high school like upper grades was created from the existing Hille school. In 2002 a high school division was permitted and the "Gesamt (overall) Schule Hille" was renamed "Verbundsschule Hille".

There is also school in community Hille for children that could benefit from reformed upbringing as well a school for the speech impaired; both serve all of Kreis Minden-Lübbecke.

An extension of the Volkshochschule (public high school) Minden is located in the Hille community administration building in Hartum. Another public high school is located in the adjacent city of Espelkamp.
