= Oppenwehe Moor =

Coordinates: 52°30′22″N 8°30′56″E

The Oppenwehe Moor (German: Oppenweher Moor) is a raised bog in the natural region of Diepholz Moor Depression (Diepholzer Moorniederung) in North Germany. It covers a total area of around 870 ha and lies in the northeastern part of the German state of North Rhine-Westphalia as well as in Lower Saxony. It is one of the most important bogs in Northwest Germany and is one of the ten most important wet meadow reserves in North Rhine-Westphalia. It is part of the Dümmer Nature Park.

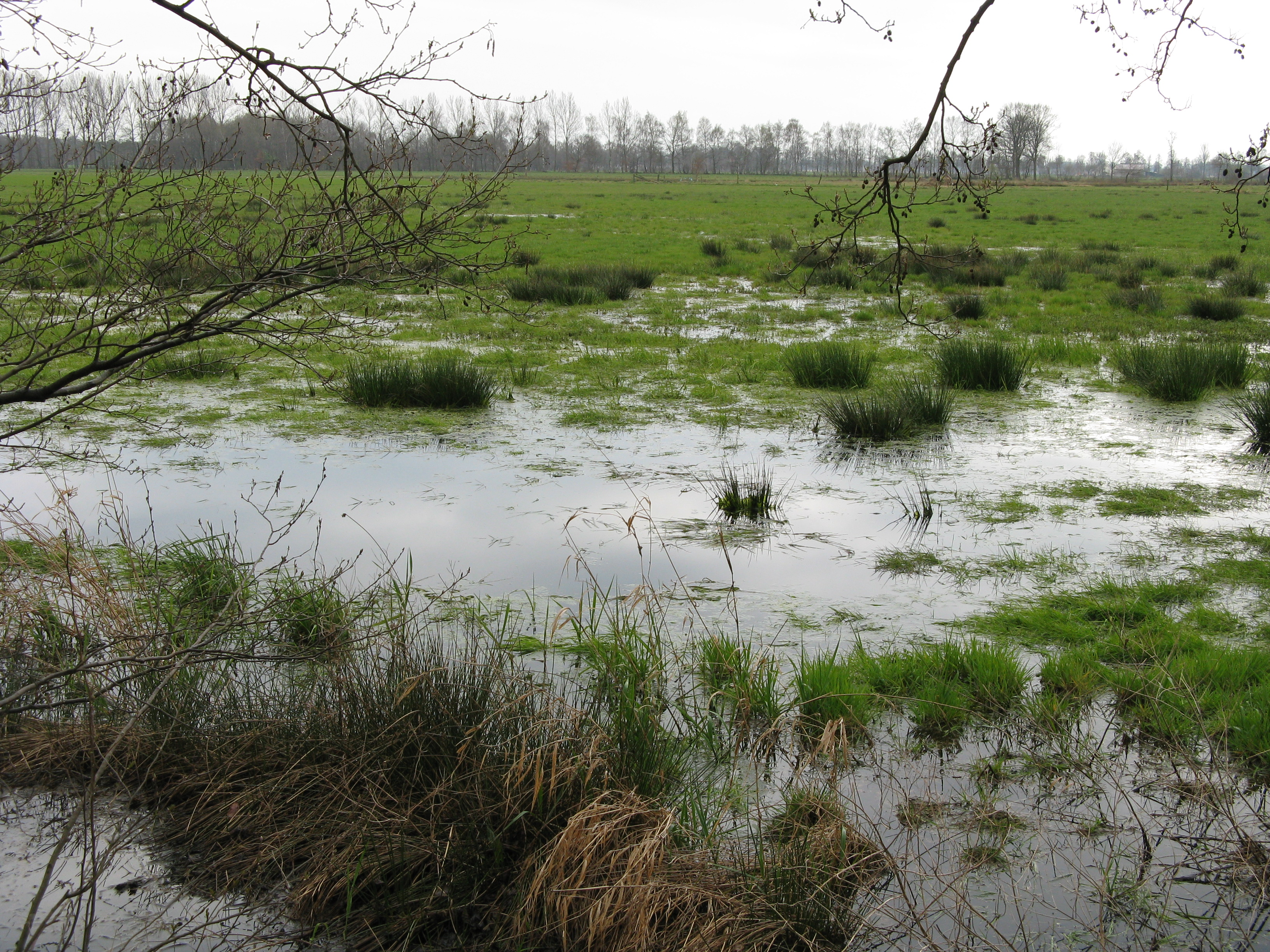
Bulrushes

The actual area of bog within the state of North Rhine-Westphalia covers 215 ha and has been a nature reserve since 1974. The landowner of most of the real estate is the district of Minden-Lübbecke, which has bought up the plots of land with the support of the state of North Rhine-Westphalia. In spite being formerly drained, the bog forms a habitat for a large number of endangered plant and animal species. Important plants on the Oppenwehe Moor include peat mosses, cottongrass and cross-leaved heath. The peat mosses are responsible for the growth of the bog and are the most important plants in the raised bog; they can store more than twenty times their own weight of water. Their lower layers die off and become peat. The best-known and most striking plant is cottongrass. In spring the cottongrasses turn large parts of the raised bog into a sea of white. The cross-leaved heath is a typical heather plant of raised bogs. It prefers wet locations and blooms in summer.

Four circular walks run through the nature reserve and enable visitors to see rare animals and plants. In the Moorblick ("bog view") information pavilion the history of the bog and interesting information about the creation and importance of bogs is displayed. The nature reserve, Am Oppenweher Moor, borders the raised bog to the south and is 275 ha in area.
