= Espelkamp =

- Town
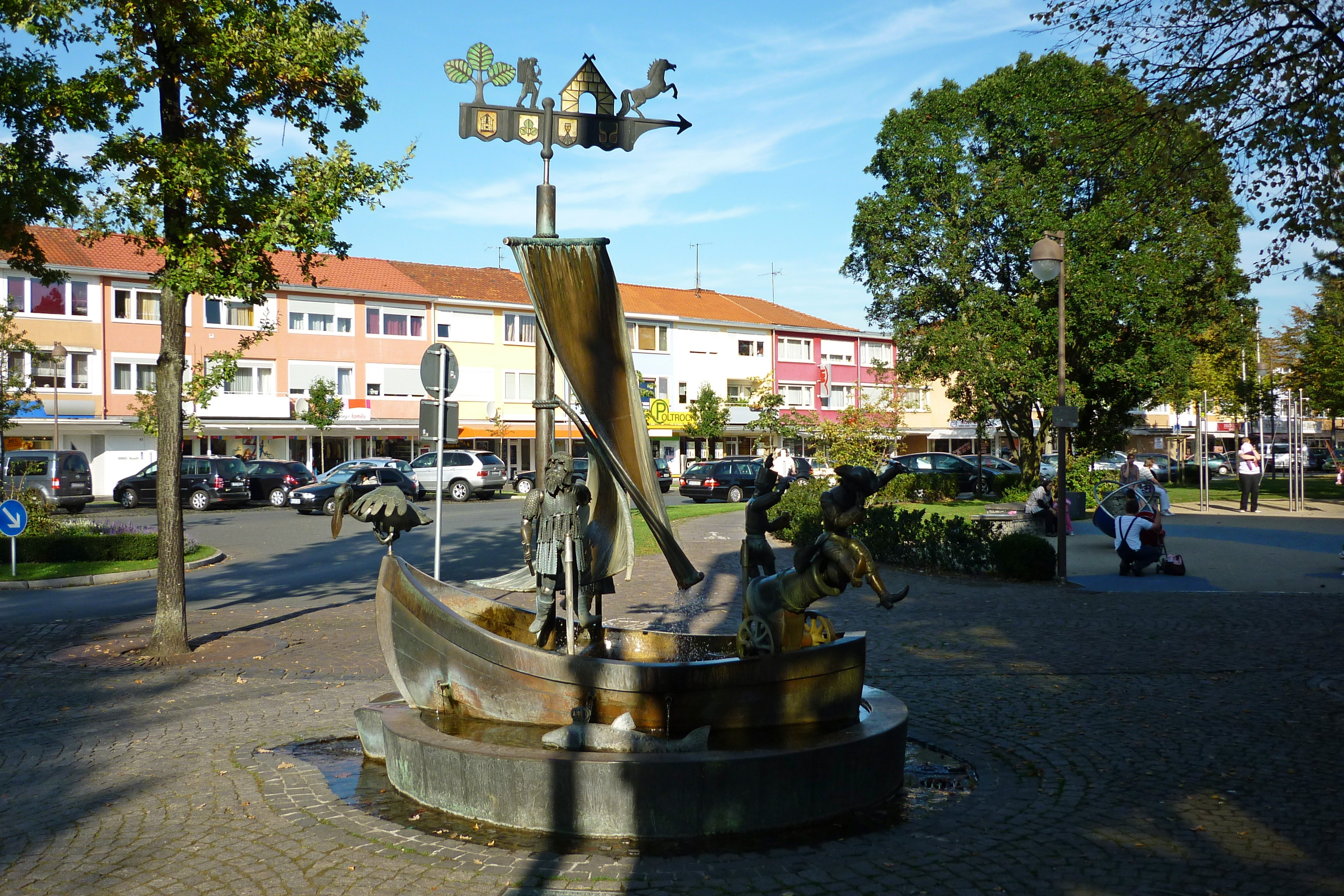

- Coat of arms

- Location of Espelkamp within Minden-Lübbecke district
- Interactive map of Espelkamp
- Location within Germany Location within North Rhine-Westphalia
- Coordinates: 52°22′38″N 8°37′58″E
- Country: Germany
- State: North Rhine-Westphalia
- Admin. region: Detmold
- District: Minden-Lübbecke
- Subdivisions: 9 districts

Government
  - Mayor (2020–25): Henning Vieker (CDU)
  - Governing parties: CDU

Area
  - Total: 84.21 km^{2} (32.51 sq mi)
- Elevation: 50 m (160 ft)

Population (2025-12-31)
  - Total: 25,486
  - Density: 302.6/km^{2} (783.9/sq mi)
- Time zone: UTC+01:00 (CET)
  - Summer (DST): UTC+02:00 (CEST)
- Postal codes: 32339
- Dialling codes: 05772
- Vehicle registration: MI
- Website: www.espelkamp.de

Espelkamp (German pronunciation: [ˈɛspl̩ˌkamp]; Low German: Espelkämpe) is a town in the Minden-Lübbecke district, in North Rhine-Westphalia, Germany.

== Geography ==
Espelkamp is situated approximately 10 kilometers north of Lübbecke and 20 kilometers north-west of Minden.

The is located on the site of a former ammunition factory Heeres-Munitionsanstalt Lübbecke. After World War II, it was used to house ethnic German refugees from former eastern territories.

=== Neighbouring places ===
- Hille
- Lübbecke
- Preußisch Oldendorf
- Stemwede
- Rahden
- Samtgemeinde Uchte

=== Town subdivisions ===
After the local government reforms of 1973 Espelkamp consists of 9 districts:

village	population: 31. Dez. 2007	Stadtgliederung Stadtgliederung
Altgemeinde Espelkamp	965	Stadtgliederung Stadtgliederung
Fabbenstedt	829	Stadtgliederung Stadtgliederung
Fiestel	1.023	Stadtgliederung Stadtgliederung
Frotheim	2.674	Stadtgliederung Stadtgliederung
Gestringen	1.834	Stadtgliederung Stadtgliederung
Isenstedt	2.658	Stadtgliederung Stadtgliederung
Schmalge	399	Stadtgliederung Stadtgliederung
Vehlage	618	Stadtgliederung Stadtgliederung
Espelkamp Zentrum¹	15.553	Stadtgliederung Stadtgliederung

== Population ==
Historical population

Year	Pop.	±% p.a.
1965	20,447	—
1970	21,846	+1.33%
1975	22,672	+0.75%
1980	23,045	+0.33%
1985	21,769	−1.13%
1990	26,101	+3.70%
1995	27,004	+0.68%

Year	Pop.	±% p.a.
2000	26,952	−0.04%
2005	26,126	−0.62%
2010	25,236	−0.69%
2015	24,921	−0.25%
2020	24,676	−0.20%
2025	25,486	+0.65%

Source: Landesdatabank Nordrhein-Westfalen

== Twin towns – sister cities ==
Espelkamp is twinned with:

- Angermünde, Germany
- Borås, Sweden
- Nagykőrös, Hungary
- Torgelow, Germany
