= Prussian T 11 =

Early 1900s Prussian locomotives

Prussian T 11 DRG Class 74.0–3 PKP Class OKi1 État-Belge Type 95
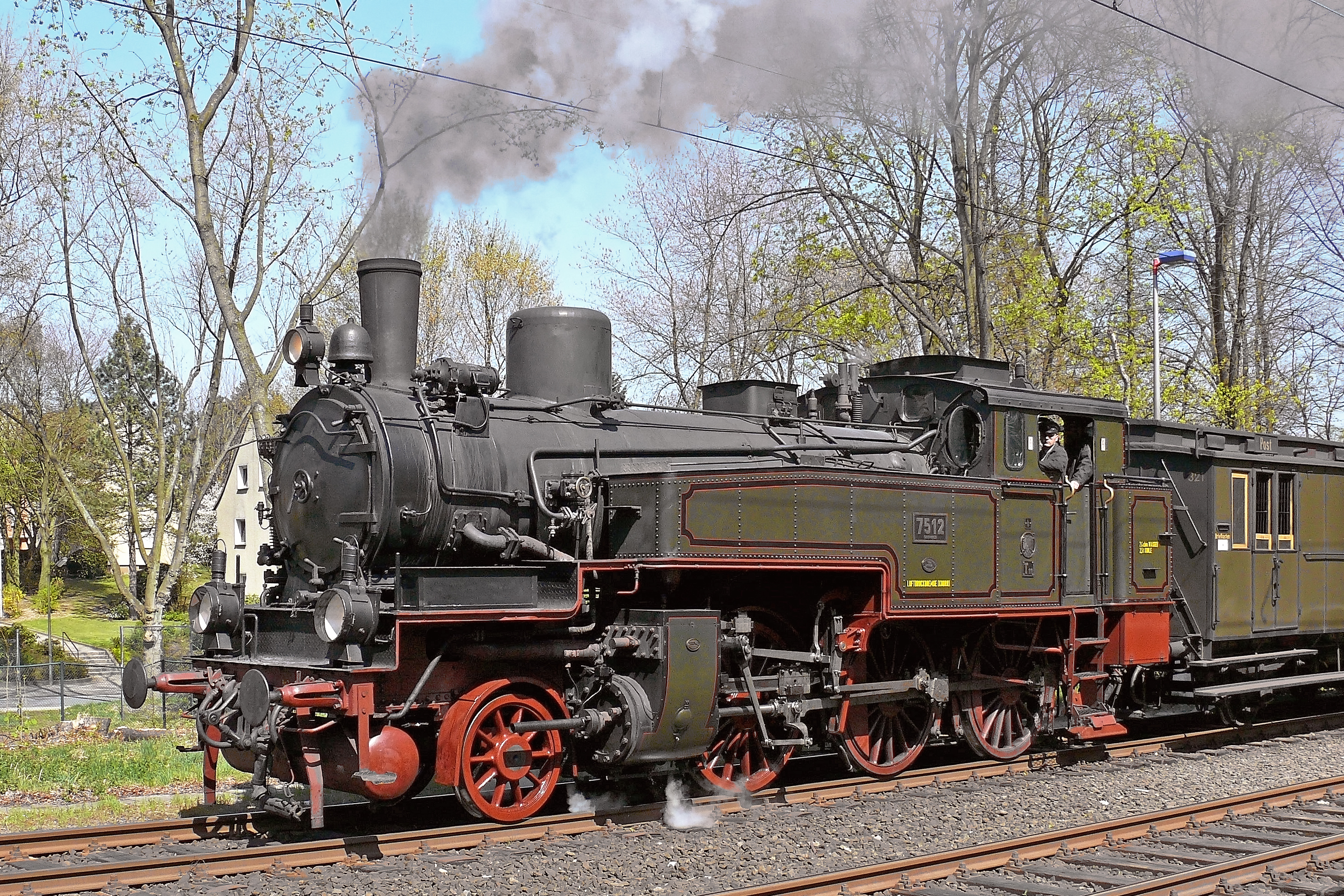
Type and origin
- Builder: Union; Borsig; Hohenzollern; AG Vulcan Stettin; Linke-Hofmann
- Build date: 1903–1910
- Total produced: 470
Specifications
- Configuration
  - Whyte: 2-6-0T
  - German: Pt 34.16
- Gauge: 1,435 mm (4 ft 8 1/2 in)
- Leading dia.: 1,000 mm (3 ft 3 3/8 in)
- Driver dia.: 1,500 mm (4 ft 11 in)
- Wheelbase
  - Overall: 6,350 mm (20 ft 10 in)
- Length
  - Over beams: 11,190 mm (36 ft 8 1/2 in)
- Height: 4,200 mm (13 ft 9 3/8 in)
- Axle load: 16.0 tonnes (15.7 long tons; 17.6 short tons)
- Adhesive weight: 47.4 tonnes (46.7 long tons; 52.2 short tons)
- Service weight: 62.3 tonnes (61.3 long tons; 68.7 short tons)
- Fuel capacity: Coal: 2.5 m^{3} (88 cu ft)
- Water cap.: 7,400 litres (1,600 imp gal; 2,000 US gal)
- Boiler
- Heating tube length: 4,000 mm (13 ft 1 1/2 in)
- Boiler pressure: 12 bar (1.20 MPa; 174 psi)
- Heating surface
  - Firebox: 1.73 m^{2} (18.6 sq ft)
  - Evaporative: 116.40 m^{2} (1,252.9 sq ft)
- Cylinders: 2
- Cylinder size: 480 mm (18 7/8 in)
- Piston stroke: 630 mm (24 13/16 in)
- Valve gear: Outside Walschaerts (Heusinger)
- Loco brake: Knorr compressed-air brake
- Parking brake: Exter counterweight brake
Performance figures
- Maximum speed: 80 km/h (50 mph)
- Indicated power: 382 kW (519 PS; 512 hp)
Career
- Numbers: DRG 74 001–358
- Retired: 1974

The Prussian Class T 11 were passenger tank locomotives produced between 1903 and 1910 in the service of the Prussian state railways for duties on the Berlin Stadtbahn.

== History ==
Between 1903 and 1910, 470 engines of this type were procured for the Prussian Railways from four manufacturers. Like the superheated locomotive, the Prussian T 12, the T 11 evolved from the T 9.3 in order to replace the older, four-coupled tank engines on the Berlin Stadtbahn and suburban route in other cities. Construction of the T 11 was ceased in 1910 in favour of the more economical T 12.

The locomotives were employed together with the T 12s especially on the Berlin Stadtbahn until its electrification in 1926–1933; as a result they had direction plates (Richtungsschilder) on their smokebox and coal tanks. But they were also used in suburban services for other cities such as Frankfurt, Hamburg and Altona.

At the end of World War I, 56 locomotives were transferred to the new Polish state where that became PKP class OKi1, and were numbered OKi1-1 to OKi1-52 and OKi1-1Dz to OKi-4Dz (the locomotives with the 'Dz' suffix were nominally owned by the Free City of Danzig). In addition 25 locomotives were surrendered as reparations to France; two went to the Administration des chemins de fer d'Alsace et de Lorraine (AL) as 7300 and 7301, while the other 23 went to the Chemins de fer de Paris, Lyon et Mediterrannee (PLM) as 5752 to 5774 (5774 was renumbered 5751 about 1920); in the PLM's 1924 renumbering scheme they became 130.BT.1 to 130.BT.23. Another 23 locomotives were transferred to Belgian State Railways, where they were classified as the type 95 .

In 1923, 16 engines were fitted with a superheater, but they retained their existing running numbers.

In 1925, the Deutsche Reichsbahn took over the 358 remaining locomotives as DRG Class 74.0–3, allocating them the numbers 74 001 to 74 358.

During World War II, the 54 surviving Polish OKi1 locomotives were divided up between the DRB (48 locomotives) and the Soviet Railways (6); the DRB renumbered their locomotives 74 011 to 74 269, re-using the numbers of withdrawn locomotives. An additional four were acquired from the Soviets in 1944; they became 74 273 to 74 332. The Germans also borrowed the seven remaining ex-PLM locomotives from the SNCF.

At the end of World War II, there were still 120 examples of these engines in service in Germany, 65 with the Deutsche Bundesbahn and 55 with the Deutsche Reichsbahn (GDR) in East Germany. The majority of T 11s were retired by 1950 in the west and the 1960s in the east; but two engines (74 231 and 74 240) continued to work the Erfurt Industrial Railway until 1974 and 1973 respectively.

Two locomotives have been preserved:

- 74 104. Built by Borsig (no.5424 of 1904) as Berlin Division 2163, it was renumbered 7560 in 1906 and became part of the PKP fleet after World War I, being renumbered OKi1-14. It was renumbered 74 104 (second) by the Germans in 1941. It returned to Poland after the war, and was renumbered OKi1-28 (second). It was withdrawn in 1966 and set aside for preservation, and is now in the Warsaw Railway Museum.
- 74 231. Built by Union Giesserei Königsberg (no.1602 of 1908) as Hannover Division 7515, it was part of the DR fleet unit it was sold to the Erfurt Industrial Railway in 1965, where is carried numbers 6 (1965–68) and 2 (1968–74). It then went to the DR at Erfurt as a monument, becoming part of the DB museum in 1992. It was sold in 1988 to the Minden Museum Railway in 1999, and was restored in the Meiningen Steam Locomotive Works. It has been working since 2000.

== Design ==
All four axles of the locomotives – even the carrying axles – were more or less equally loaded with a hefty 16 tonnes. The carrying axle was linked to the first coupled axle via a Krauss-Helmholtz bogie. The axles were located in a plate frame, inside which a well tank was rivetted.

The first units had piston valves, the later ones slide valves. The riveted boiler barrel comprised two boiler shells and the smokebox was also rivetted. At the back of the boiler was the copper firebox. Two vacuum Dampfstrahlpumpen served as feed pumps.

For the brakes, there was, next to the smokebox a single-stage air pump, and in front of the carrying axle were one or two air reservoirs.

== T 11 of the Lübeck-Büchen Railway ==
The Lübeck-Büchen Railway also placed nine T 11s in service between 1906 and 1908; they had been built by Linke-Hofmann

The four engines taken over by Deutsche Reichsbahn in 1938, with numbers 74 361 to 74 364, were however not the Prussian T 11 — they were withdrawn from service between 1923 and 1929 — but the LBE's own special designs (LBE T10) based that were more like the Prussian T 9.3 and which had been built in 1911/1912 by Linke-Hofmann in a batch of five. The drive resembled that of the T 11, apart from the smaller coupled wheels with a 1,400 mm diameter, whilst the boiler was smaller too. The last of these engines was not retired until 1951.

== See also ==
- Prussian state railways
- List of Prussian locomotives and railcars
