= Hüllhorst =

- Municipality
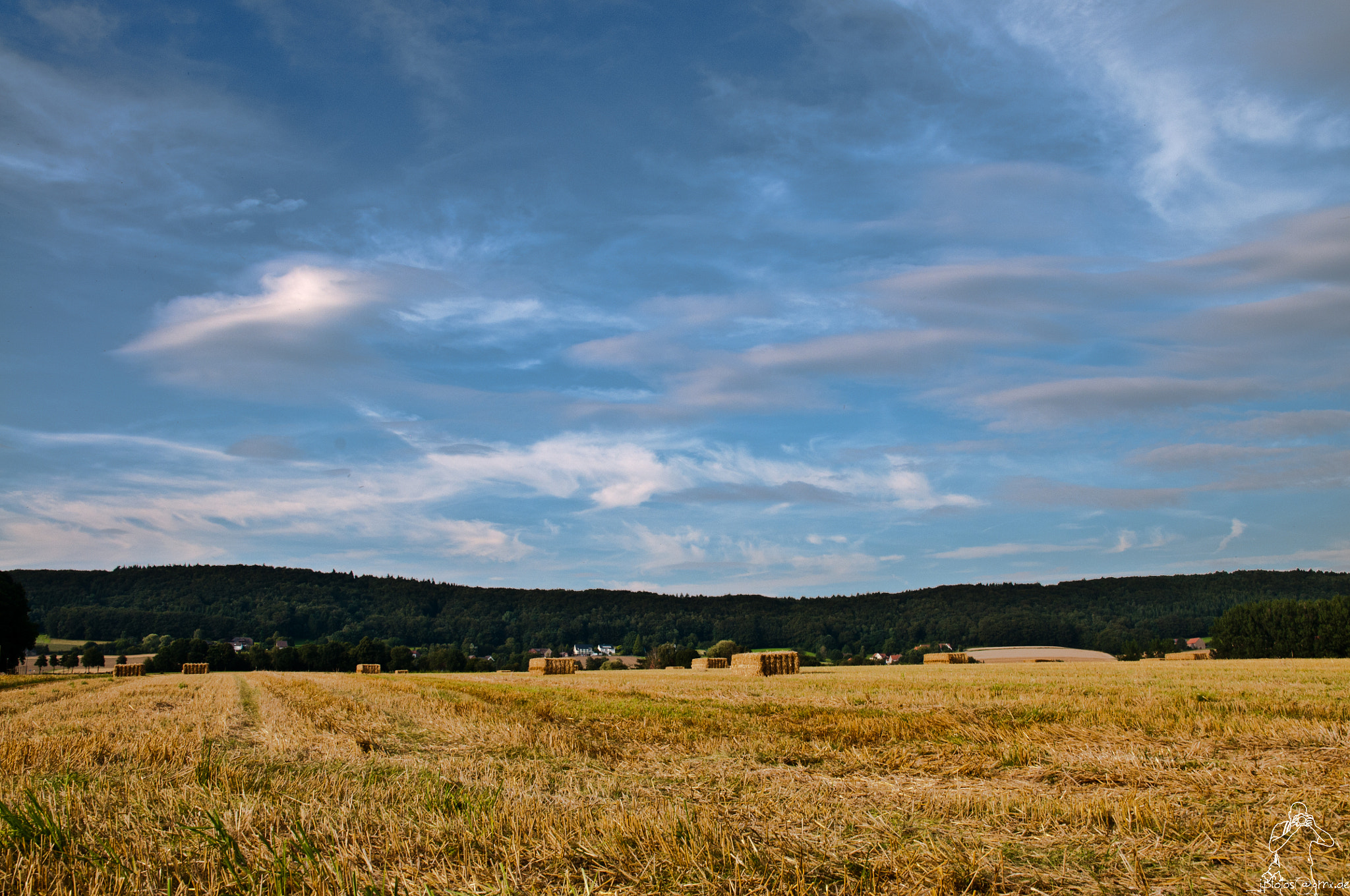

- Coat of arms

- Location of Hüllhorst within Minden-Lübbecke district
- Interactive map of Hüllhorst
- Location within Germany Location within North Rhine-Westphalia
- Coordinates: 52°17′N 08°40′E
- Country: Germany
- State: North Rhine-Westphalia
- Admin. region: Detmold
- District: Minden-Lübbecke
- Subdivisions: 8

Government
  - Mayor (2020–25): Michael Kasche (CDU)

Area
  - Total: 44.7 km^{2} (17.3 sq mi)
- Elevation: 115 m (377 ft)

Population (2025-12-31)
  - Total: 13,212
  - Density: 296/km^{2} (766/sq mi)
- Time zone: UTC+01:00 (CET)
  - Summer (DST): UTC+02:00 (CEST)
- Postal codes: 32609
- Dialling codes: 05744
- Vehicle registration: MI
- Website: www.huellhorst.de

Hüllhorst (German pronunciation: [ˈhʏlˌhɔʁst]; Low German: Hüllhuost) is a municipality of the Minden-Lübbecke district, in North Rhine-Westphalia, Germany.

== Geography ==
Hüllhorst is situated on the south side of the Wiehengebirge, approx. 5 km south-east of Lübbecke and 20 km west of Minden.

=== Neighbouring places ===
- Lübbecke
- Preußisch Oldendorf
- Hille
- Bad Oeynhausen
- Löhne
- Kirchlengern
- Rödinghausen

=== Subdivisions of the municipality ===
Hüllhorst consists of 9 districts (Population as of December 31, 2006):

- Ahlsen-Reineberg (1,009 inhabitants)
- Bröderhausen (687 inhabitants)
- Büttendorf (794 inhabitants)
- Holsen (1,080 inhabitants)
- Huchzen (45 inhabitants)
- Hüllhorst (2,761 inhabitants)
- Oberbauerschaft (2,998 inhabitants)
- Schnathorst (2,850 inhabitants)
- Tengern (2,038 inhabitants)

== Population ==
Historical population

Year	Pop.	±% p.a.
1965	10,732	—
1970	11,177	+0.82%
1975	11,154	−0.04%
1980	11,036	−0.21%
1985	10,953	−0.15%
1990	11,747	+1.41%
1995	12,657	+1.50%

Year	Pop.	±% p.a.
2000	13,603	+1.45%
2005	13,655	+0.08%
2010	13,351	−0.45%
2015	13,271	−0.12%
2020	13,051	−0.33%
2025	13,212	+0.25%

Source: Landesdatabank Nordrhein-Westfalen

== See also ==
- Hüllhorst Comprehensive School
