= Bastau =

River in Germany

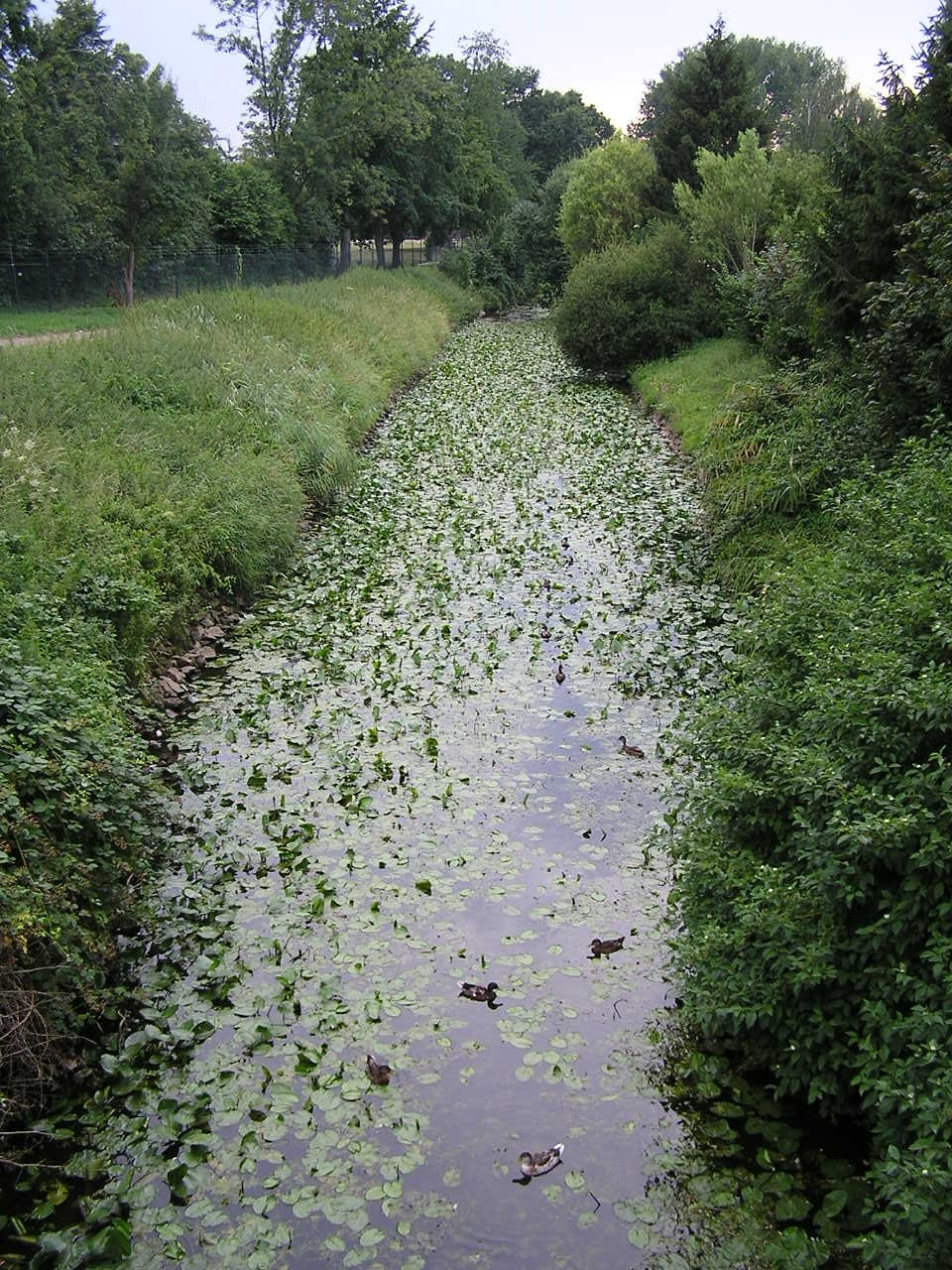

Location
- Country: Germany
- State: North Rhine-Westphalia

Physical characteristics
- Mouth
  - location: Weser
  - coordinates: 52.2858°N 8.9211°E
- Length: 19.2 km (11.9 mi)

Basin features
- Progression: Weser→ North Sea

Bastau is a river of North Rhine-Westphalia, Germany. It flows into the Weser in Minden.

== See also ==
- List of rivers of North Rhine-Westphalia
