= Stemwede =

- Town
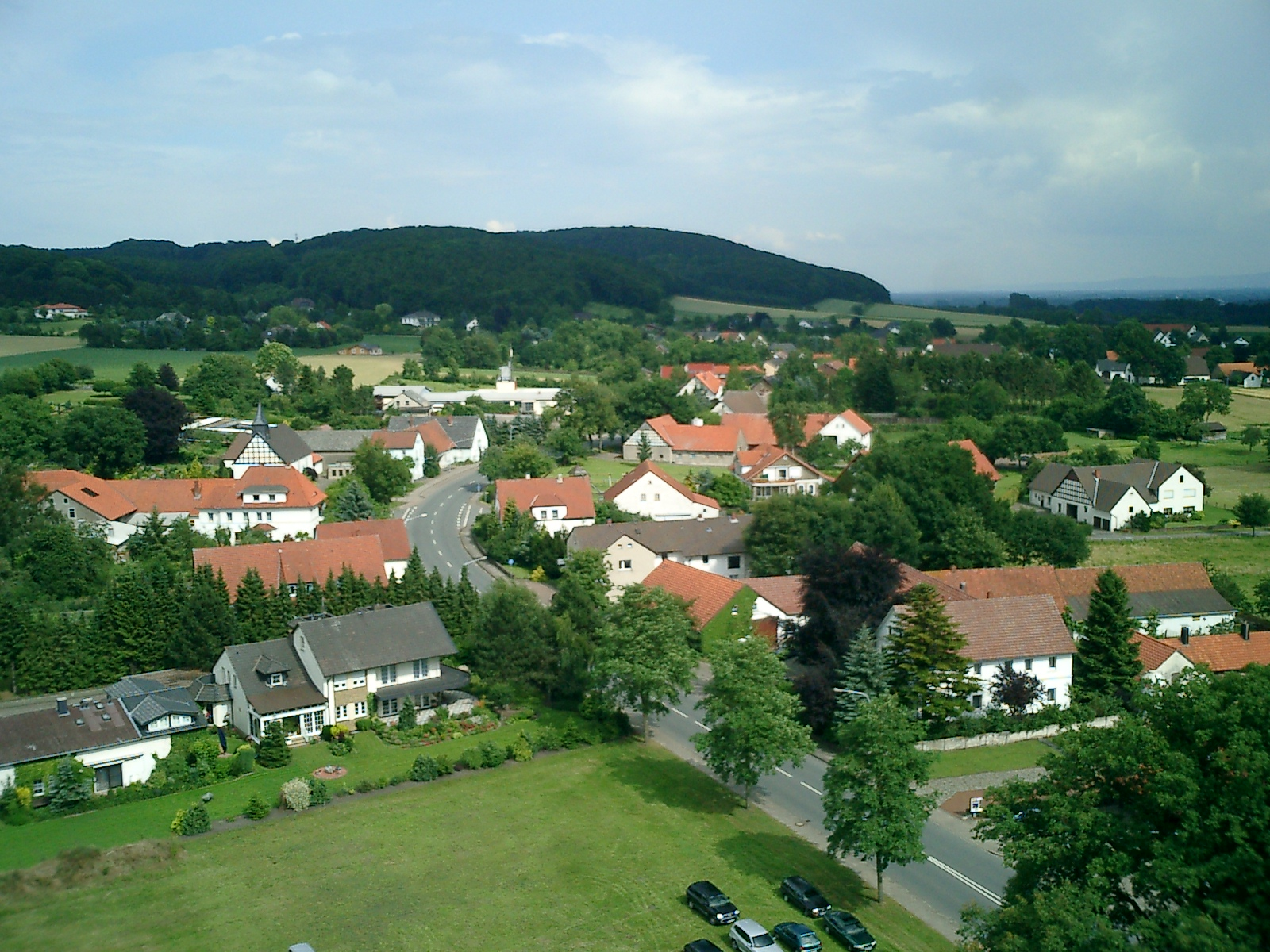

- Flag Coat of arms

- Location of Stemwede within Minden-Lübbecke district
- Interactive map of Stemwede
- Location within Germany Location within North Rhine-Westphalia
- Coordinates: 52°25′N 8°26′E
- Country: Germany
- State: North Rhine-Westphalia
- Admin. region: Detmold
- District: Minden-Lübbecke
- Subdivisions: 3

Government
  - Mayor (2020–25): Kai Abruszat (FDP)

Area
  - Total: 166.13 km^{2} (64.14 sq mi)
- Elevation: 41 m (135 ft)

Population (2025-12-31)
  - Total: 13,323
  - Density: 80.196/km^{2} (207.71/sq mi)
- Time zone: UTC+01:00 (CET)
  - Summer (DST): UTC+02:00 (CEST)
- Postal codes: 32351
- Dialling codes: 05474, 05773, 05745
- Vehicle registration: MI, LK
- Website: www.stemwede.de

Stemwede (German pronunciation: [ʃtɛmˈveːdə]; Low German: Stemwäide) is a municipality in the Minden-Lübbecke district, in North Rhine-Westphalia, Germany. Following a recent regional reorganization, in 1973, the former districts of Dielingen-Wehdem and Levern were consolidated and the district of "Stemwede" created. The new name was chosen because for a thousand years the area along the Stemweder Berg (mountain) was popularly referred to as Stemwede.

== Geography ==
Stemwede is situated approximately 20 km north-west of Lübbecke.

=== Subdivisions of the town ===
The municipality of Stemwede is divided into 3 districts (consisting of the following villages each):

- District Levern
  - Levern
  - Sundern
  - Niedermehnen
  - Destel
  - Twiehausen
- District Dielingen
  - Drohne
  - Dielingen
  - Haldem
  - Arrenkamp
- District Wehdem
  - Westrup
  - Wehdem
  - Oppendorf
  - Oppenwehe

== Population ==
Historical population

Year	Pop.	±% p.a.
1965	13,534	—
1970	13,705	+0.25%
1975	13,616	−0.13%
1980	13,356	−0.38%
1985	12,630	−1.11%
1990	13,194	+0.88%
1995	14,049	+1.26%

Year	Pop.	±% p.a.
2000	14,398	+0.49%
2005	14,501	+0.14%
2010	13,819	−0.96%
2015	13,571	−0.36%
2020	13,046	−0.79%
2025	13,323	+0.42%

Source: Landesdatabank Nordrhein-Westfalen
