= Westfalica =

Westfalica may refer to:

- Porta Westfalica, town in Germany
- Porta Westfalica (gorge), gorge in Germany
- Porta Westfalica station, railway station in Germany
- Jakobsberg (Porta Westfalica), hill in Germany
- Emperor William Monument (Porta Westfalica), monument in Germany
- Gordonia westfalica, species of bacteria
- Viola lutea var. westfalica, species of violet
