= Jakobsberg (Porta Westfalica) =

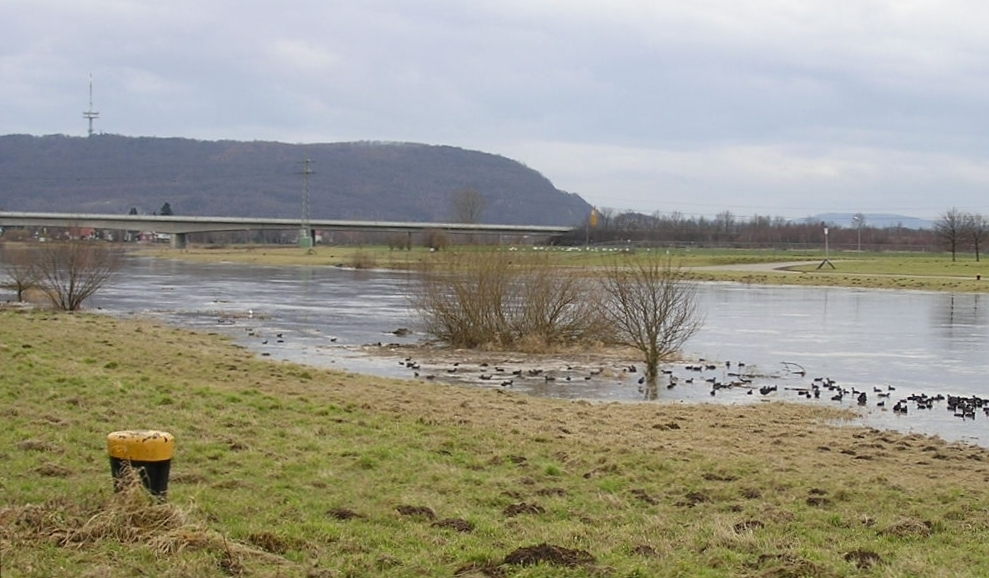
- Jakobsberg from the north

Highest point
- Elevation: 235 m (771 ft)
- Coordinates: 52°14′31″N 8°56′10″E

Geography
- Location within North Rhine-Westphalia
- Location: Minden-Lübbecke district, North Rhine-Westphalia, Germany (East side of the Porta Westfalica)
- Parent range: Wesergebirge

The Jakobsberg (German pronunciation: [ˈjaːkɔpsˌbɛʁk]) is a hill, 235.2 m above sea level (NN), that forms the westernmost peak of the Wesergebirge chain and is the eastern guardian of the Weser gorge, the Porta Westfalica or "Westphalian Gate", in North Rhine-Westphalia (Germany).

The summit is the site of the Jakobsberg Telecommunication Tower, which stands on the site of a former Bismarck Tower, near the Bismarckburg Inn, the Schlageter Monument and the Porta Bluff. Its name has been commonly used since 1788, when a Prussian publican (Zöllner), by the name of Jakob, cultivated a vineyard on its southern slopes.

== Geography ==
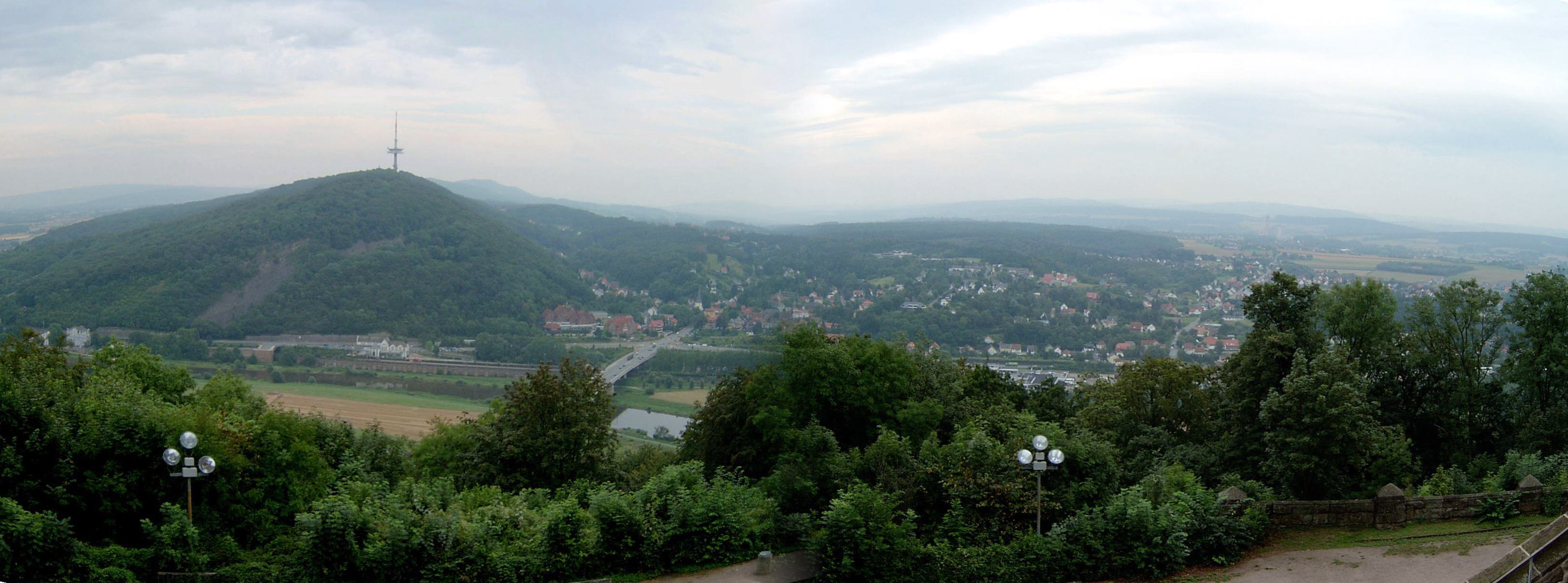
Panoramic view of the Porta Westfalica from the Kaiser Wilhelm Monument with the Jakobsberg

The Jakobsberg rises at the western end of the Wesergebirge hills in the district of Minden-Lübbecke directly northwest of the town of Porta Westfalica and about 6 km south of the town of Minden which lies beside the Minden Aqueduct. It is located due east of the gorge of Porta Westfalica, which is on the northern perimeter of the Weser Uplands and southern boundary of the North German Plain, and through which the River Weser flows from the hill country northwards into the plain. The hill on the opposite side of the gorge to the west, the Wittekindsberg (294.2 m), which is the eastern guardian of the Wiehen Hills, defines the western side of this gorge.

The Jakobsberg is surrounded by the extreme eastern parts of the North Teutoburg Forest-Wiehen Hills Nature Park that runs from just in front of the Bückeburg into the Wiehen Hills.

== Bismarck Tower, Porta Westfalica ==
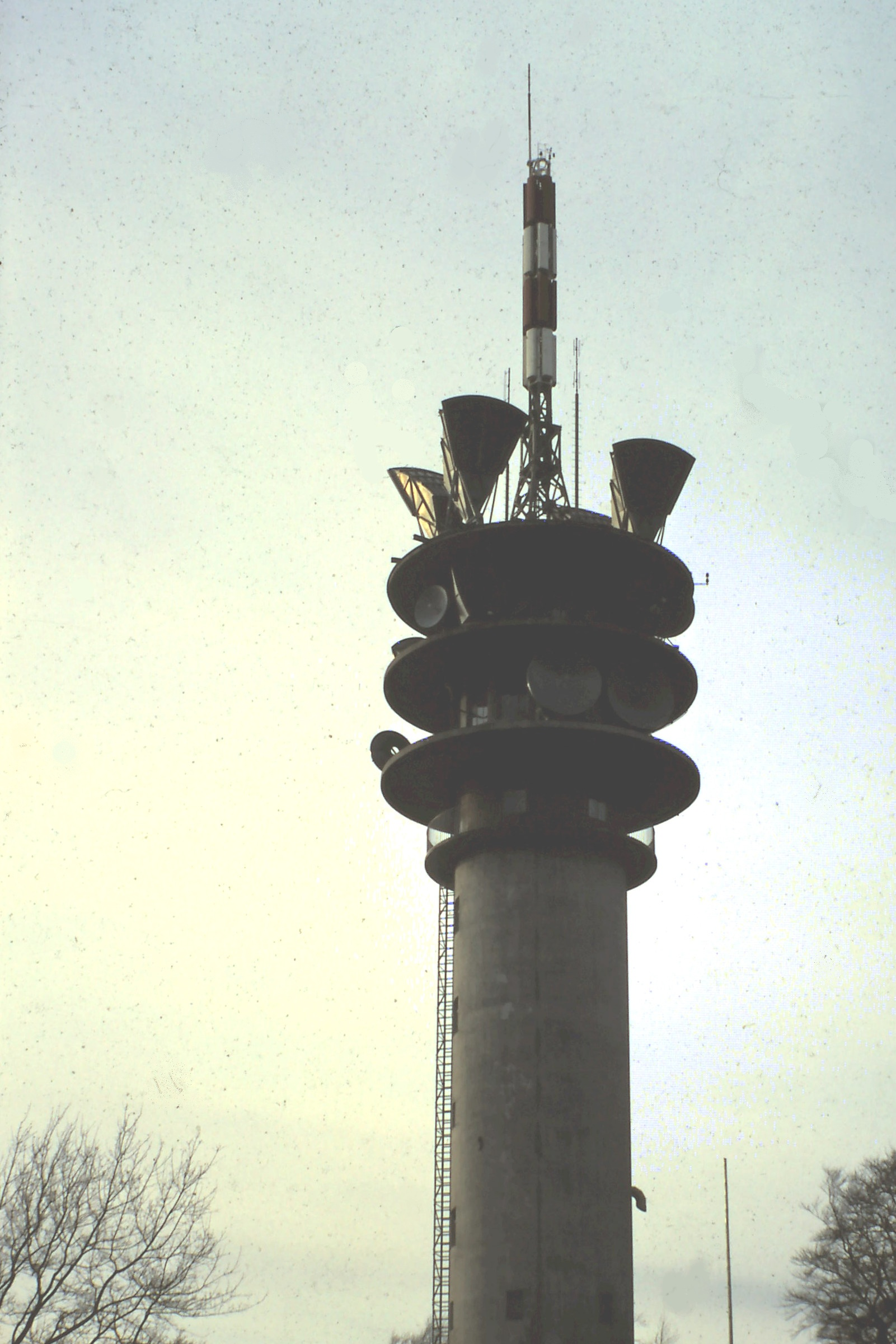
The old Bismarck Tower (1952 to 1974)

In 1902 a Bismarck Tower was built on the highest point of the Jakobsberg (235.2 m) im memory of the old imperial Reich Chancellor, Otto von Bismarck (1815–1898), by his admirers. The tower consisted of sandstone blocks, was 22 m high and was looked after by the Bismarck Federation (Bismarkbund). On its 50th anniversary (1952) it was torn down in order to make way for the first transmission tower on the Jakobsberg. The sandstone blocks of the Bismarck Tower were used to rebuild the town hall in Minden that had been destroyed in the Second World War.

== Underground manufacturing facility ==
In the closing phase of the Second World War, most likely in March 1944, the manufacture of pipes by the firm of Philips was moved from the Netherlands to the Jakobsberg. Disused galleries of an old iron ore mine were developed. Such galleries run through many parts of the Wiehen Hills and Wesergebirge, their entrances are usually walled up nowadays and made unrecognisable. In Hausberge and Barkhausen there was a satellite of Neuengamme concentration camp with over a thousand prisoners, of which a considerable number worked in the Jakobsberg. Women from the area also worked, under much better conditions, in the hill. After the end of the war the local population used their surviving knowledge of the mine system running through the hills to collect material from the production facilities and sell it on the black market. The British occupation forces brought this to an end, with demolition charges whose shockwave caused pictures to fall from the walls up to of 15 kilometres away and created part of the present-day riverside front of the Jakobsberg.

== Transmission towers ==
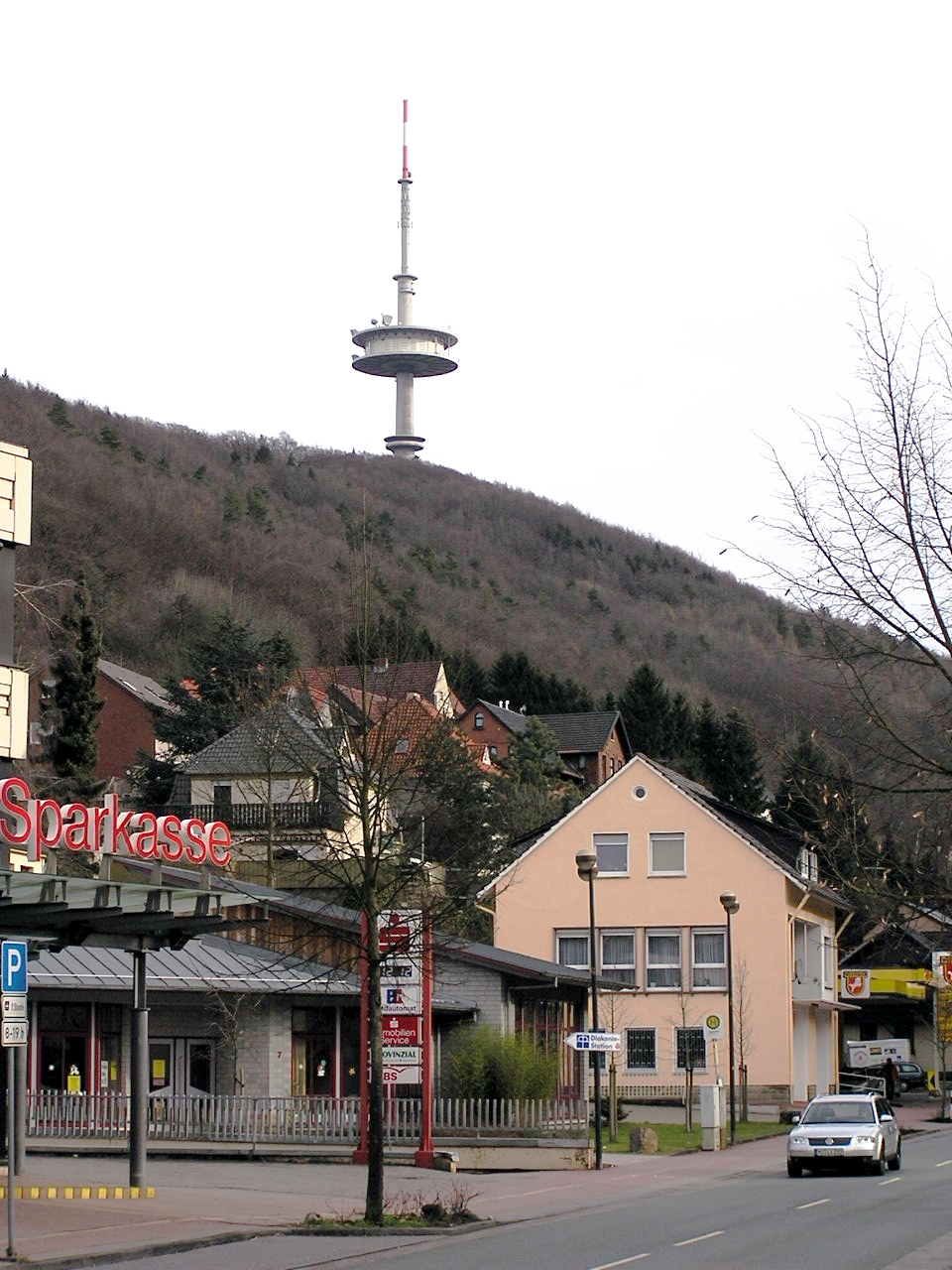
The Jakobsberg tower seen from Hausberge

=== Old transmission tower ===
On the site of the former observation tower, the Bismarckturm Porta Westfalica, a steel and concrete transmission tower was built in 1952. It was also called the Bismarck Tower. The Deutsche Bundespost, who had bought the land needed for the tower from the Bismarck Federation, was contractually committed as the owner of the transmission tower to establish a Bismarck memorial on the new tower and a public viewing platform.

=== New transmission tower ===
The Jakobsberg Telecommunication Tower (known locally as Langer Jakob or "Long James") was built on the site of the old Bismarck Tower from 1974 to 1978, also in concrete and steel. It is a 142 m high transmission tower (standard tower).

The Deutsche Bundespost, as owners of the tower, was once again contractually obliged to have a Bismarck memorial and an observation platform on the new tower. Today the tower is owned by Deutsche Telekom.

The Jakobsberg Telecommunication Tower has an operations room at a height of 50 m and an observation platform open to the public at a height of 23.26 m, from which a good all-round view may be enjoyed, for example over parts of the Weser Uplands and the North German Plain as well as the Kaiser Wilhelm Monument on the Wittekindsberg.

== Bismarckburg Inn ==
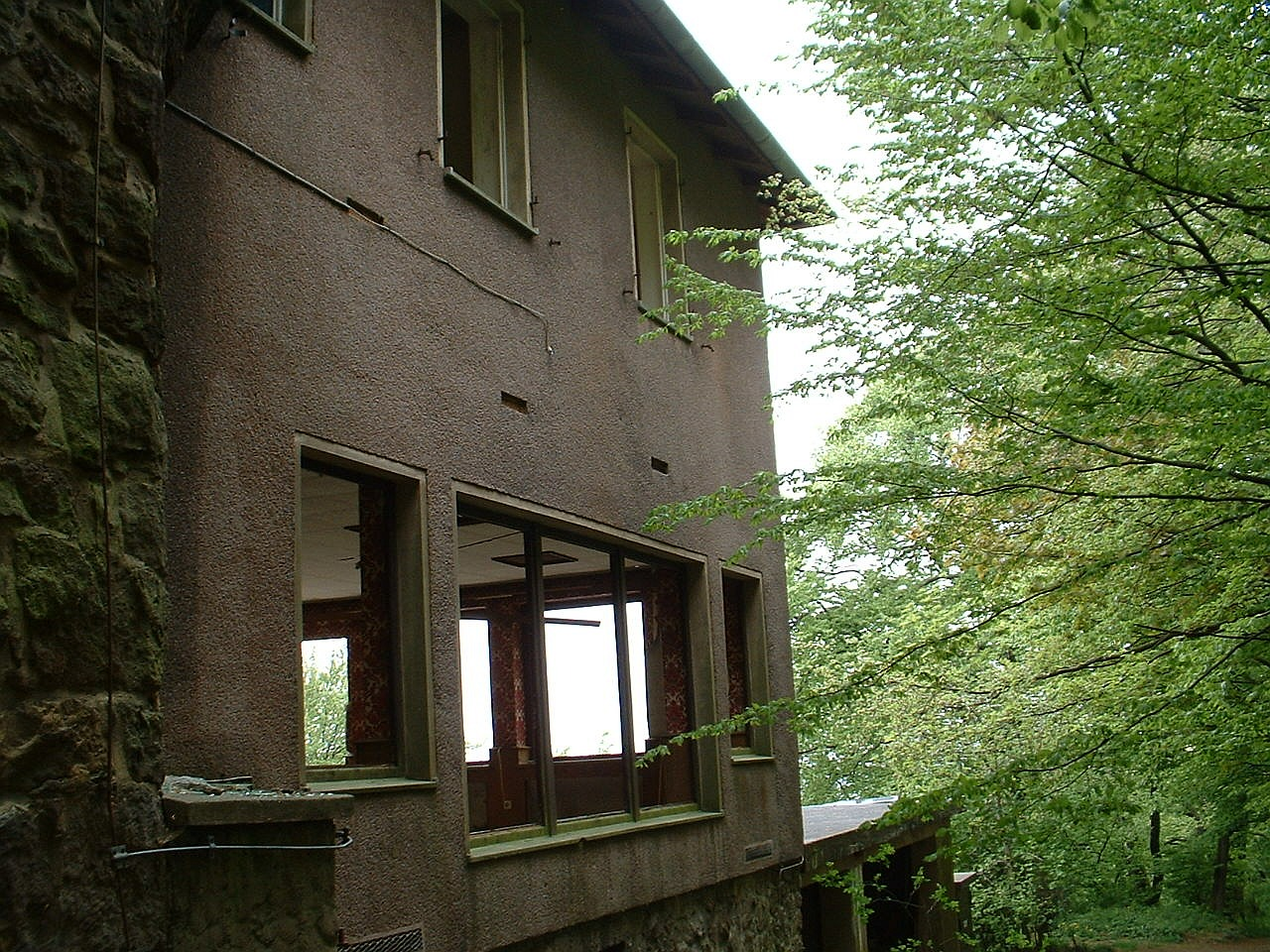
Bismarckburg Inn

A few metres west of the Jakobsberg transmission tower is Gaststätte Bismarckburg, an inn that was built at the end of the 18th century and is rich in tradition. It acted as a falconry as well as being a popular local destination. It adapted to changing circumstances over time by undergoing several conversions; but has since become empty and fallen into disrepair.

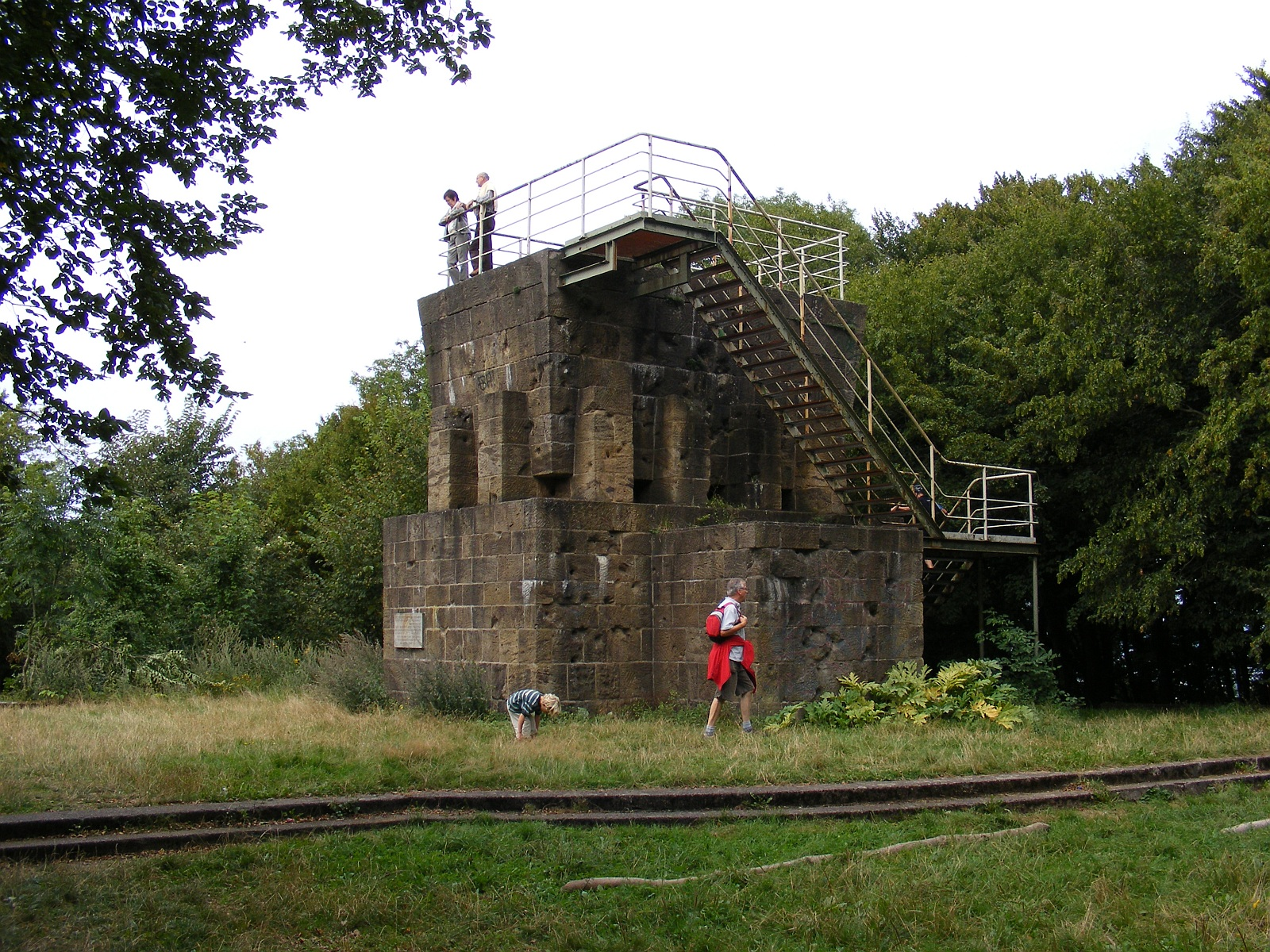
Schlageter Monument

== Schlageter Monument ==
On the crest of the Jakobsberg towards the southwest and just under 650 m (as the crow flies) west of the Bismarckburg Inn at a height of 216.5 m above NN are the ruins of the Schlageter Monument. Built in 1933/34, it was never completed, probably for ideological reasons. On a plinth was a large cross. This only stood there for a short time before being moved to Minden's North Cemetery (Nordfriedhof). There it was integrated into a memorial for those who fell in the First World War.

In 1958 the authorities of the town of Porta Westfalica had the ruins of the monument made accessible and erected an observation platform on the plinth, that gives visitors a far-reaching view to the south and west, for example to the Kaiser Wilhelm Monument on the Wittekindsberg.

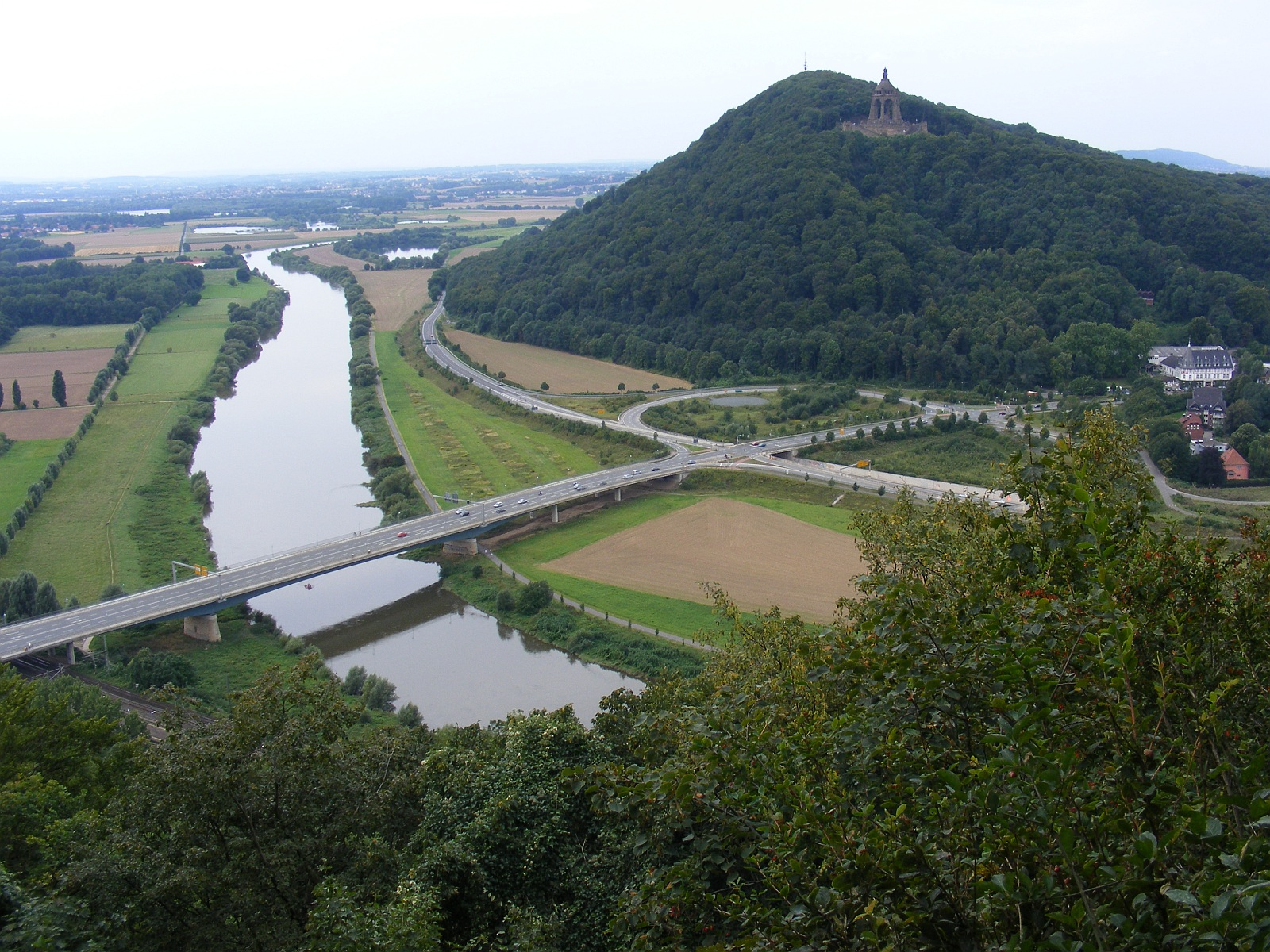
View from the Porta Bluff

== Porta Bluff ==
About 150 m northwest of the Schlageter Monument on the western slopes of the Jakobsberg above a steep, southwest dipping crag is the Porta Bluff (Porta Kanzel, 188.6 m above NN), a natural observation platform.

In 1887 the crag, as the Porta Bluff, was made accessible by members of the Hausberge Tourism Club. From there it offers a good view of the Kaiser Wilhelm Monument on the Wittekindsberg and over the River Weser in the Porta Westfalica gorge.

== Military training area ==
On the northern parts of the Jakobsberg (around the village of Lerbeck) is the Minden-Bückeburg training area, a military training area for the German Armed Forces, the Bundeswehr.

== Transport links ==
Near the Wittekindsberg the B 61, B 65 and B 482 federal roads cross one another. These provide links to the A 2 and A 30 motorways not far to the south as well as side roads that lead to the hill.

In addition the Jakobsberg is linked to the Deutsche Bahn railway network by Porta station, which is part of Porta Westfalica and situated at the western foot of the hill on the east bank of the Weser.

The Jakobsberg is covered by a good network of walking trails, including the European long-distance path E11 over which the points of interest on the hill may be reached. Access for private vehicles is the village of Hausberge.
