= Wittekindsberg =

Hill in North Rhine-Westphalia, Germany

Coordinates: 52°14′48.85″N 8°53′26.10″E

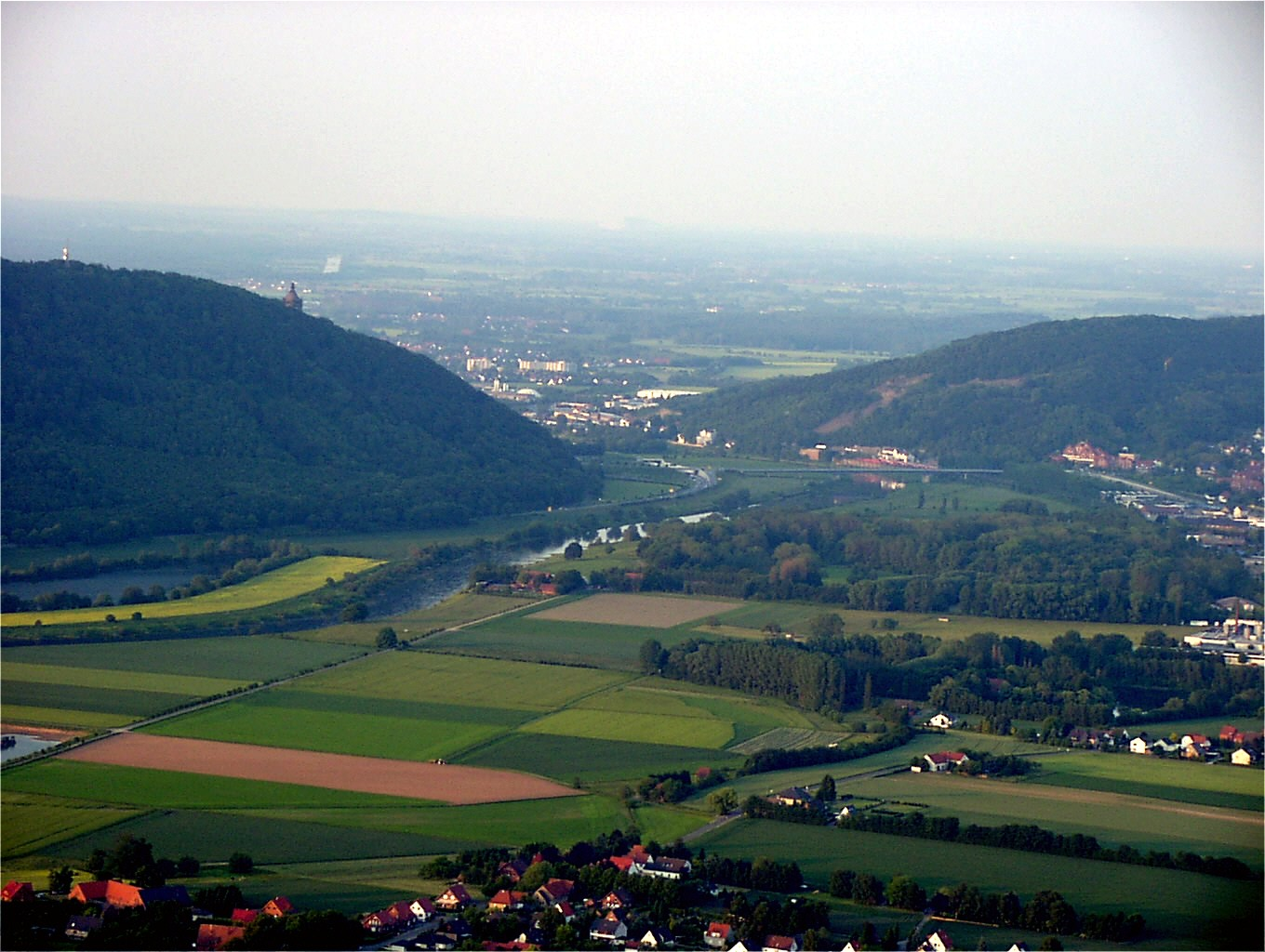
View looking north: Wittekindsberg (left) and Jakobsberg (right) by the Porta Westfalica

The Wittekindsberg is a hill, 281.48 m above sea level (NN), which forms the easternmost peak of the Wiehen Hills (German: Wiehengebirge) and is also the western guardian of the Weser gorge, the Porta Westfalica, in North Rhine-Westphalia (Germany).

The hill is well-known, especially as the site of the Emperor William Monument (Kaiser Wilhelm Denkmal), but also for the Moltke Tower and Wittekind Castle.

== Geography ==
The Wittekindsberg rises at the eastern end of the Wiehen Hills im Minden-Lübbecke district directly northwest of the village of Barkhausen within the borough of Porta Westfalica, and about 6 km south-southwest of the town of Minden. It is located due west of the Porta Westfalica gorge (the "Westphalian Gate"), that lies on the northern edge of the Weser Uplands and the southern border of the North German Plain and through which the River Weser flows from the uplands northwards into the plain. To the east is the Jakobsberg (238 m), which is the westernmost hill of the Wesergebirge and the eastern guardian overlooking the gorge.

The Wittekindsberg is surrounded by the eastern areas of the North Teutoburg Forest-Wiehen Hills Nature Park that extends from just in front of Bückeburg into the Wesergebirge.

== Emperor William Monument ==
On the east slopes of the Wittekindsberg, at a height of about 210 m, is the Emperor William Monument, built in 1896 in honour of the emperor, William I. It is a popular destination because it has good views over some of the surrounding hills, the Porta Westfalica and the southern part of the North German Plain.

== Moltke Tower ==
About 1 km (as the crow flies) west of the Emperor William Monument on the highest point of the Wittekindsberg (294.2 m above NN) is the Moltke Tower, built in 1828/29 as the Wittekindsstein observation tower and, in 1906, was renamed the Moltke Tower in honour of Field Marshal Helmuth Karl Bernhard von Moltke (1800 to 1891). From its observation deck at a height of 13.9 m, there are views of the surrounding hill country as well as the Weser Depression and the southern fringes of the North German Plain.

== Wittekind Castle ==
Around 450 m due west of the Moltke Tower at about 244 m above NN is Wittekind Castle, a former refuge castle with its nearby Wittekind well, now dried up. In 1996, within the Iron Age and Early Medieval refuge castle the foundations of the Church of the Cross (Kreuzkirche) were discovered which, thanks to conservation measures, are now open to the general public. Near the foundations is the Chapel of St. Margaret (Margarethenkapelle) from the 12th century. An inn (built in 1896/96) attracts hikers and walkers in good weather.

== Transport links ==
Near the Wittekindsberg the B 61, B 65 and B 482 federal roads cross one another. These provide links to the A 2 and A 30 motorways not far to the south as well as side roads that lead to the hill.

In addition the Wittekindesberg is linked to the Deutsche Bahn railway network by Porta station, which is part of Porta Westfalica and situated at the western foot of the Jakobsberg on the east bank of the Weser.

The Wittekindsberg is covered by a good network of walking trails, including the European long-distance path E11 from which the points of interest on the hill may be reached.

== Sources ==
- Heinrich Rüthing: Der Wittekindsberg bei Minden als »heilige Stätte«. 1000 bis 2000. Verlag für Regionalgeschichte, Bielefeld 2008. ISBN 978-3-89534-685-9 (Religion in der Geschichte, Bd. 15)
