= Kaspar von Zumbusch =

German sculptor

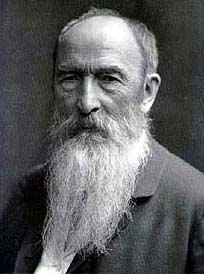
Portrait of Kaspar von Zumbusch, c. 1900

Kaspar Clemens Eduard Zumbusch (23 November 1830 – 27 September 1915), as of 1888 von Zumbusch (a nobiliary particle), was a German sculptor, born in Herzebrock, Westphalia, who became a pre-eminent sculptor of neo-Baroque monuments in Vienna.

He went at the age of eighteen to study unsuccessfully at the Academy of Fine Arts, Munich, then at the Polytechnic School of Munich under Johann Halbig. He continued his studies in Rome. He won the competition in 1866 for a monument to Maximilian II of Bavaria, for the Maximilianstraße, Munich (unveiled 1875). In 1873, he was called to Vienna as professor at the Academy of Fine Arts Vienna, a post he held until he was made Professor Emeritus in 1901. His most important works are a statue of Count Rumford, Munich; and the monuments to Prince August of Prussia (Bellevue Park, Berlin), Beethoven (1873-1880, Vienna), Maria Theresa (1887, Vienna), and to Emperor William I (1896, Wittekindsberg, Westphalia). Also in Vienna are his monuments to Count Radetzky (1891) and to Archduke Albrecht (1898-1899).

He also modeled many private funeral monuments, decorative works, and portrait busts, including one of Wagner.

He died in 1915 at Rimsting. His brother Julius Zumbusch was a sculptor and one of his sons Ludwig von Zumbusch was a graphic artist and painter. Another of his sons, Leo von Zumbusch was a dermatologist known for his contribution to the identification of generalized pustular psoriasis.

Among his pupils was the Friulian sculptor Alfonso Canciani.

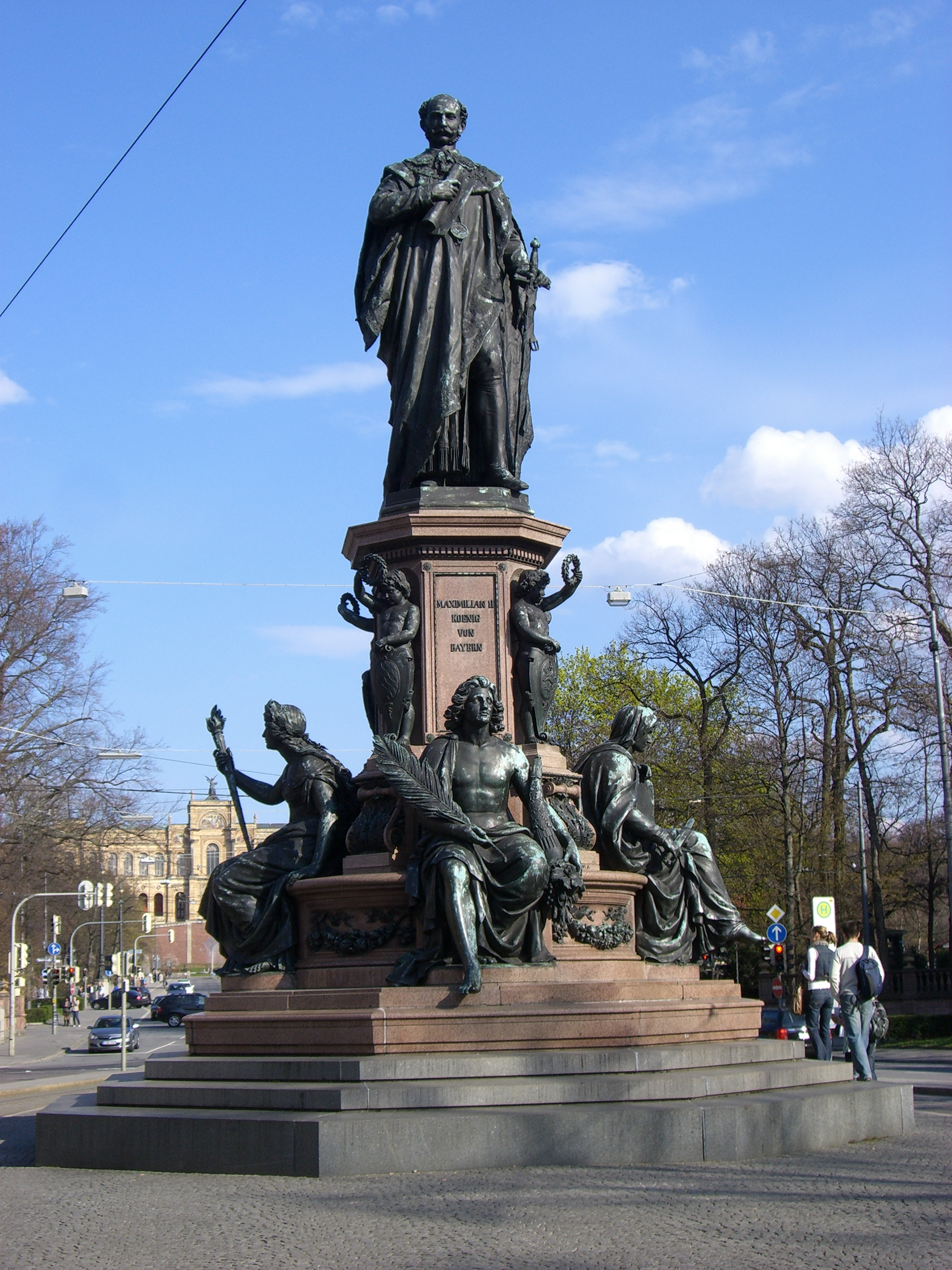
Monument to Maximilian II of Bavaria, 1866

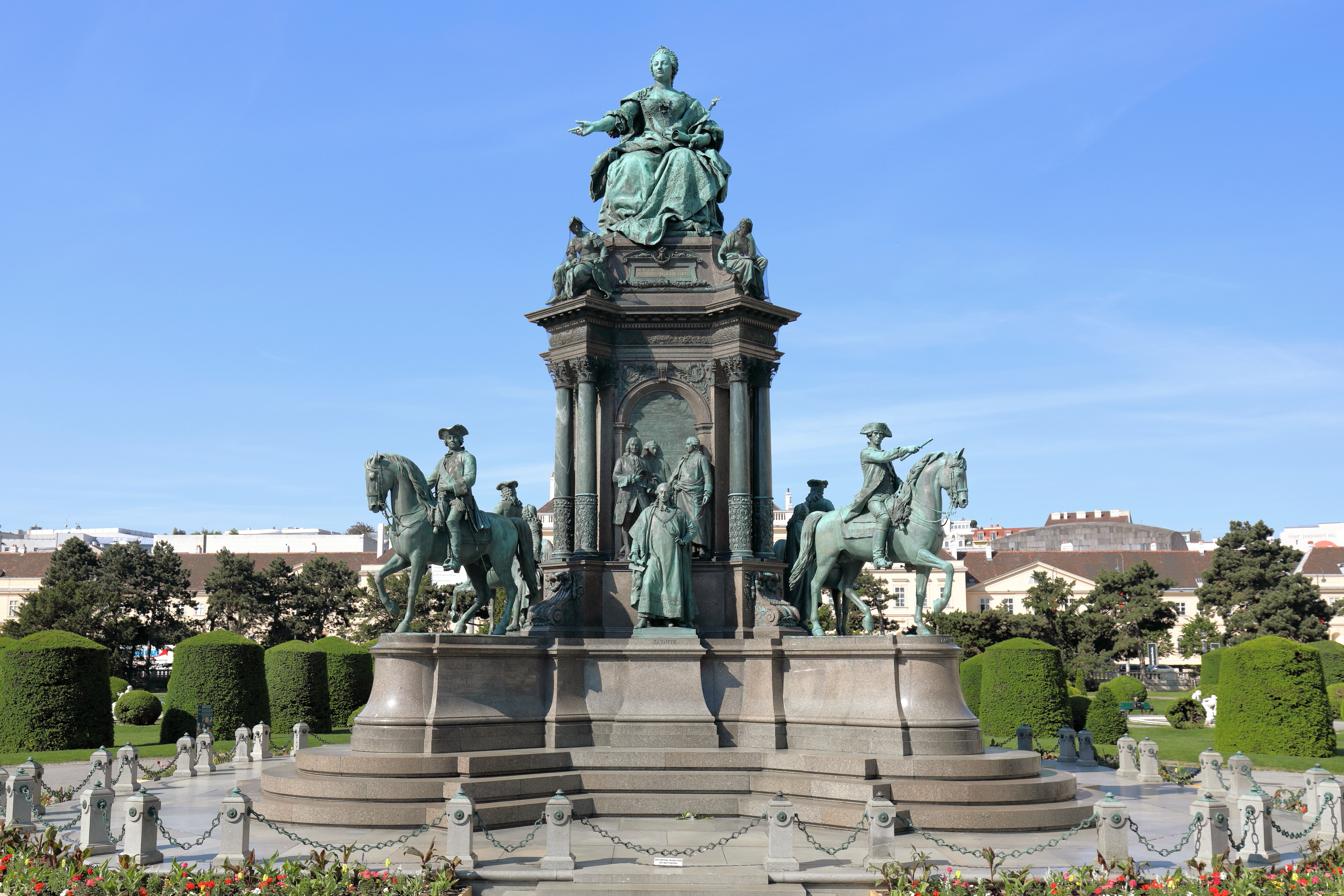
Statue of Maria Theresa in Vienna, 1872–1887

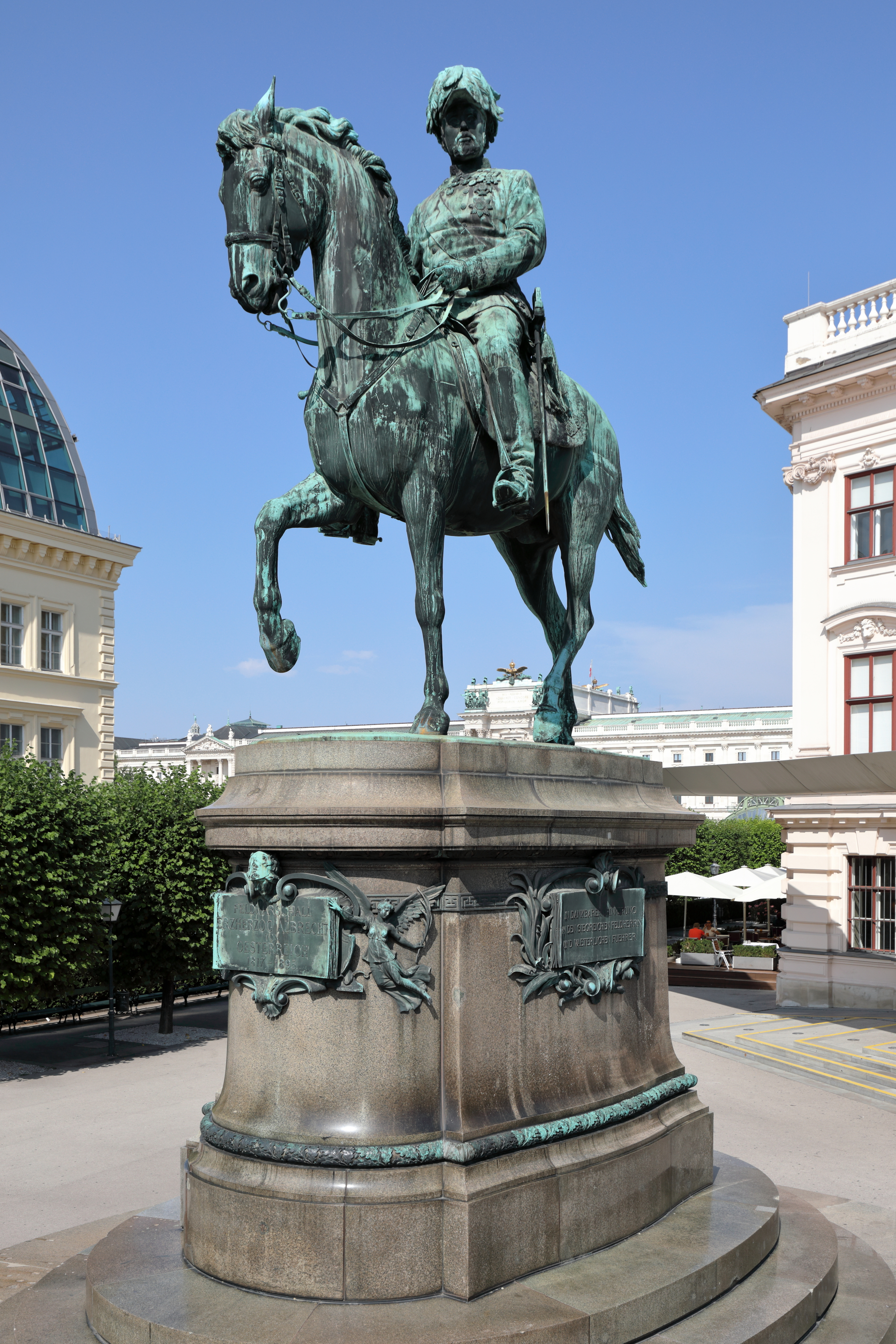
Monument to Archduke Albrecht before Albertina in Vienna, 1898–99

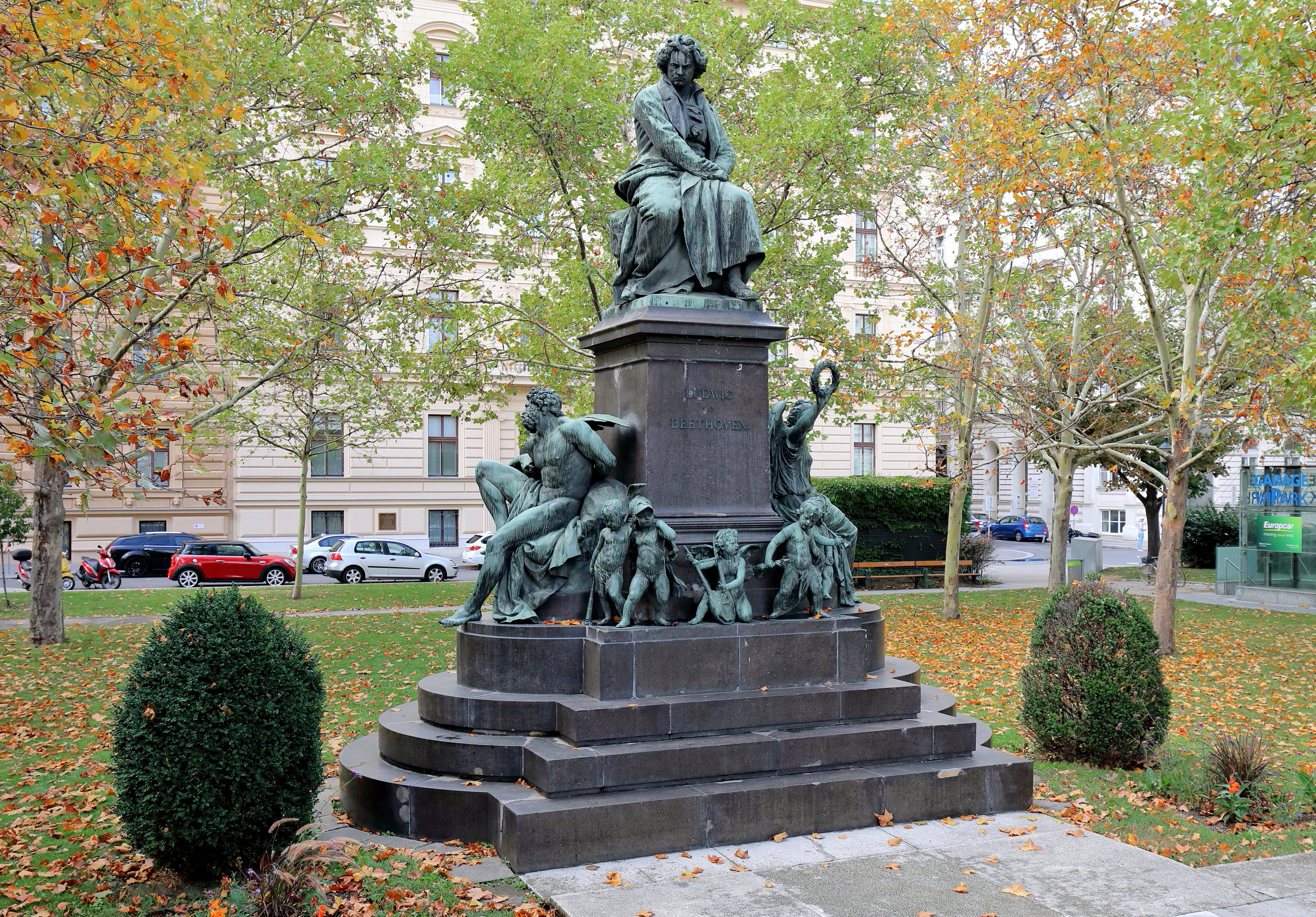
Monument to Beethoven in Vienna, 1880

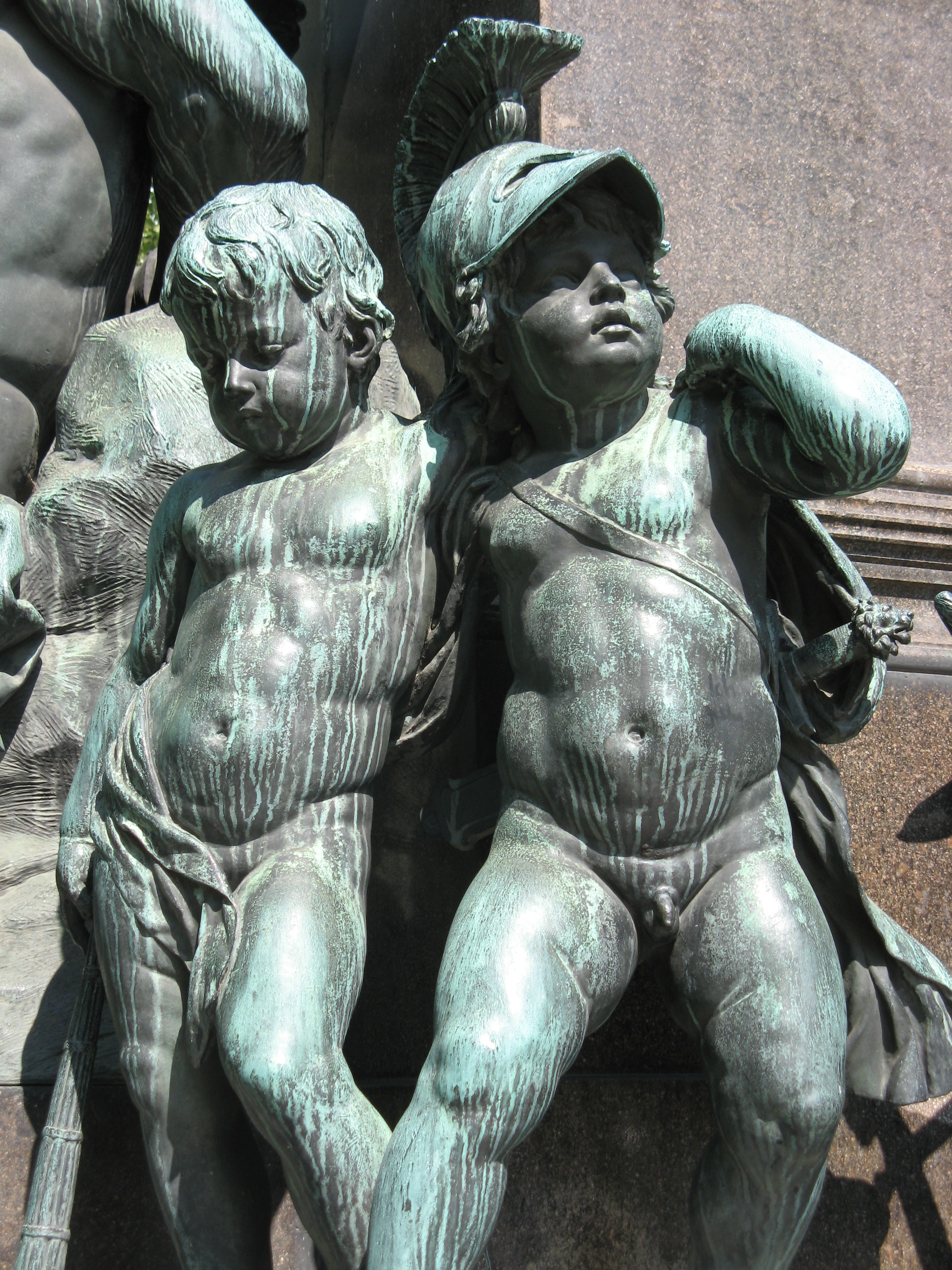
Putti on the Beethoven monument, 1880
