= Emperor William Monument (Porta Westfalica) =

Colossal monument near Porta Westfalica in North Rhine-Westphalian, Germany

Coordinates: 52°14′43″N 8°54′20″E

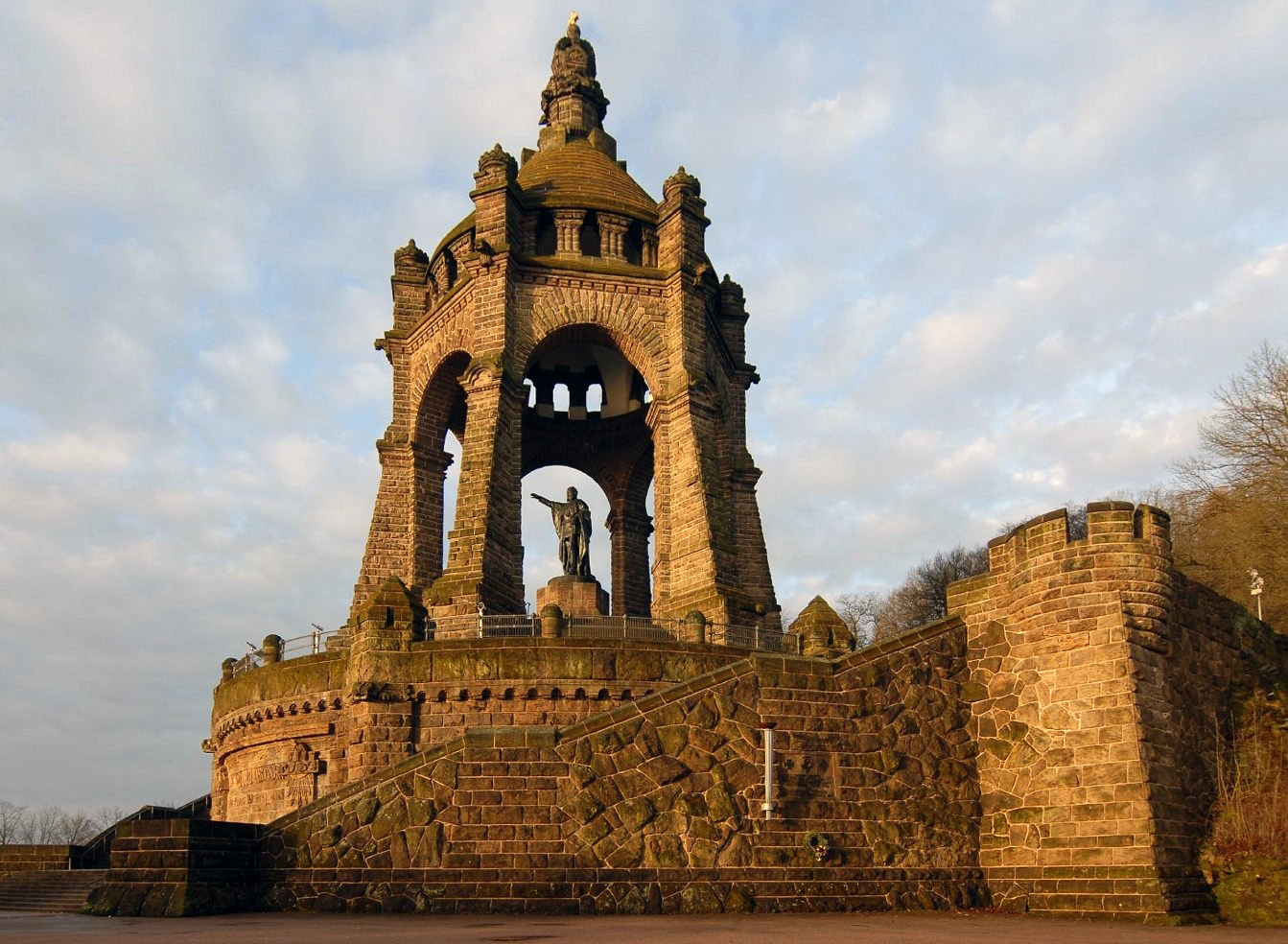
The Emperor William Monument in 2006

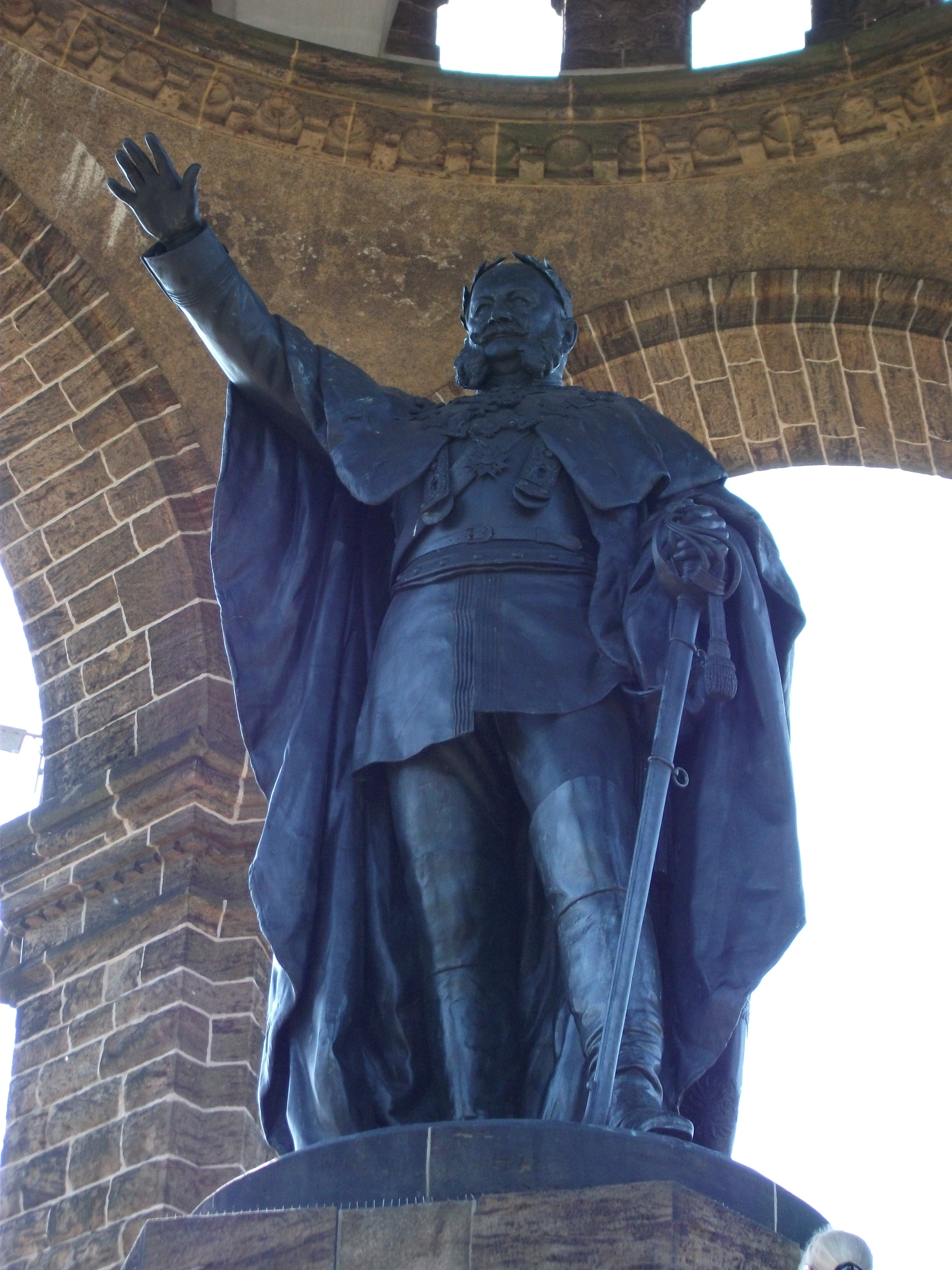
Statue of William I inside the monument

The Emperor William Monument (German: Kaiser-Wilhelm-Denkmal), near the town of Porta Westfalica in the North Rhine-Westphalian county of Minden-Lübbecke, is a colossal monument above the Weser gorge of Porta Westfalica, the "Gateway to Westphalia". It was erected to honour the first German Emperor, William I (1797–1888), by the then Prussian Province of Westphalia between 1892 and 1896 and emerged against the background of a rising German national identity. The monument, which is around 88 metres (289 ft) high, is classified as one of Germany's national monuments.

The architect of this prominent monument was Bruno Schmitz and the sculptor was Kaspar von Zumbusch. Since 2008, the monument has formed part of the Road of Monuments. As a result of its dominant geographical site, it is the most important landmark of the town of Porta Westfalica and of northern East Westphalia.

== Location ==
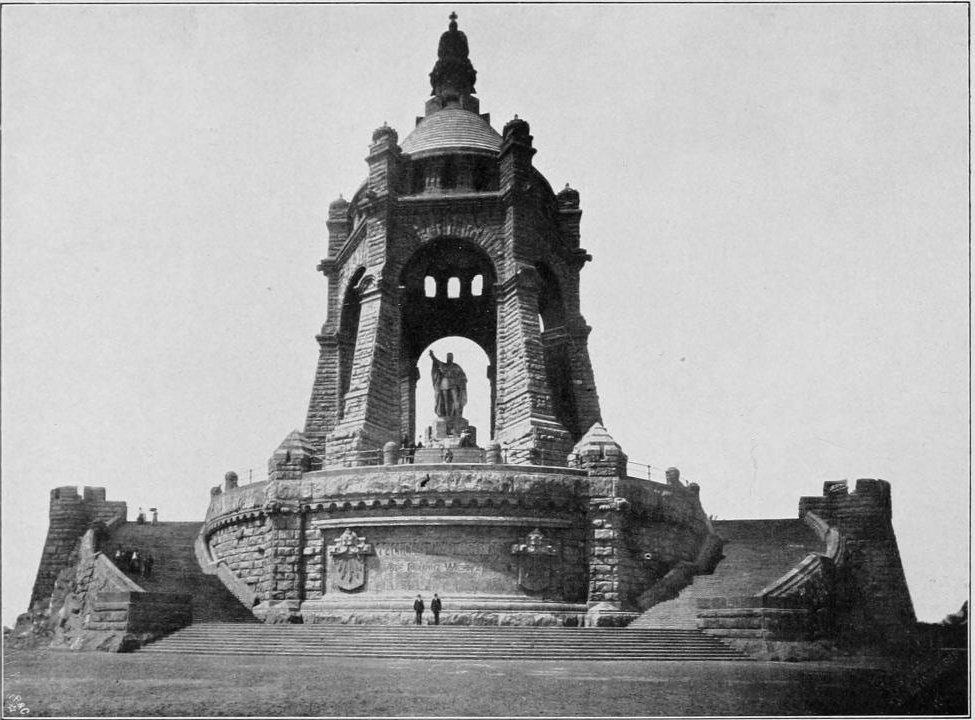
The memorial circa 1909

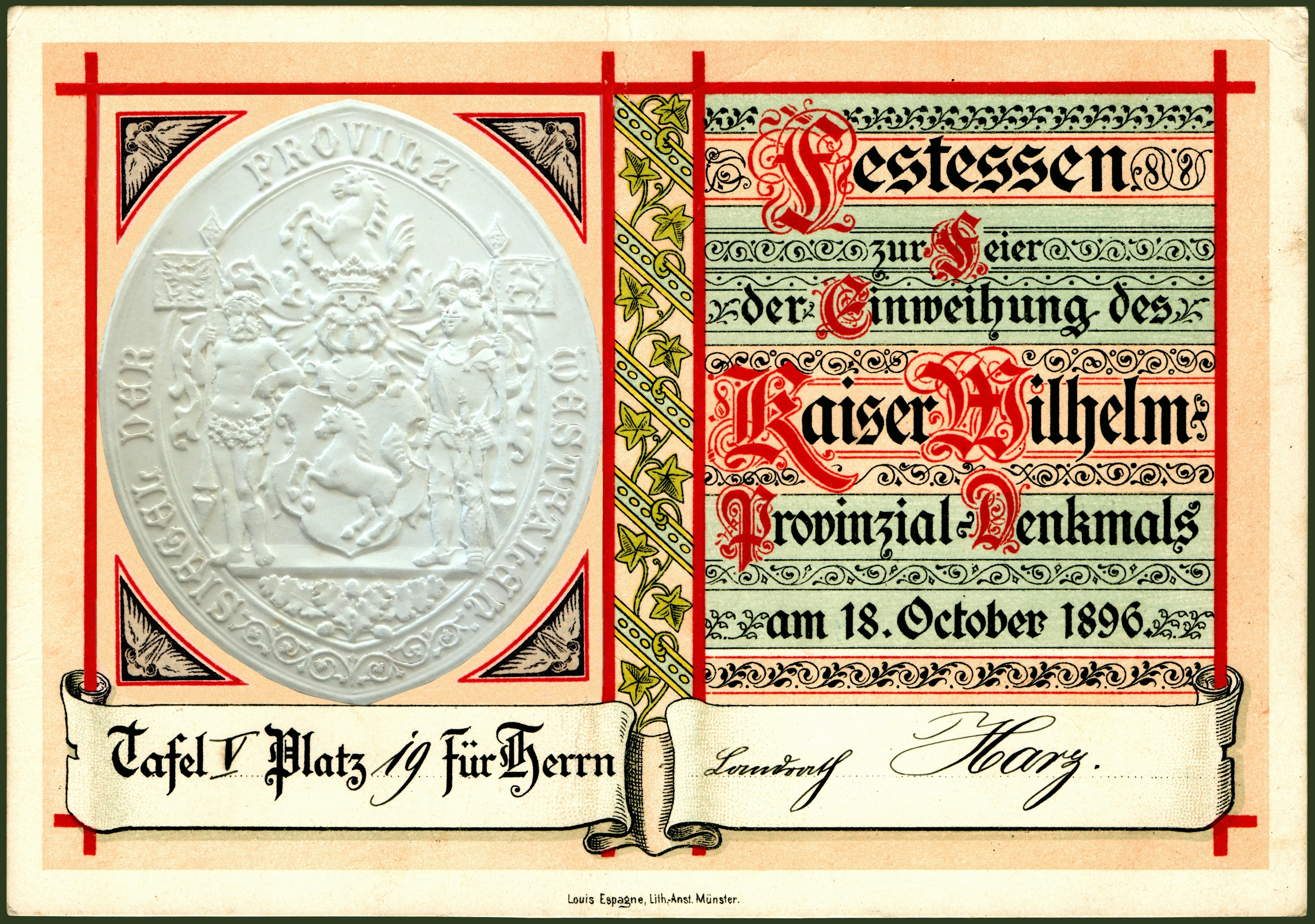
Place card for the inauguration dinner 1896

The Emperor William Monument is located at the extreme eastern end of the range of the Wiehen Hills on the eastern slopes of the Wittekindsberg (294.2 metres or 965 feet above sea level). It towers above the great gorge of Porta Westfalica, through which the River Weser flows between the Wiehen Hills in the west and the Weser Hills in the east and between the towns of Porta Westfalica in the south and Minden in the north. It is here that the Weser breaks out of the German Central Uplands and winds across the North German Plain. The site used to be on the eastern border of the old province of Westphalia with Porta Westfalica. The monument lies within the municipality of Barkhausen in the borough of Porta Westfalica.

To the east, immediately below the southeastern stairway to the broad base of the monument, is a point that is 202.9 metres (666 ft) and some way above the structure to the west is a high point, 213.8 metres (701 ft). From the foot of the monument (c. 210 metres or 690 feet) to the level (39.7 metres or 130 feet) of the Weser at a point a few metres southwest of the point in the gorge where the Bundesstraße 61 (Portastraße) crosses the river there is a height difference of about 170 metres (560 ft).

== History ==
Following the death of Emperor William I, monuments in his honour were built all over Prussia and in other major German cities. On 15 March 1889, the government of the province of Westphalia voted with a small majority to erect their Emperor William Monument at the Westphalian Gate (Porta Westfalica).

Caspar von Zumbusch of Herzebrock was commissioned to create the bronze statue of William I. A competition was held by the province to select an architect to design its setting and 58 were submitted. The prizegiving jury, which also came from Zumbusch awarded first prize to Berlin architect, Bruno Schmitz, whose design was chosen for the monument. Another first prize was awarded to Dresden architects, Richard Reuter and Theodor Fischer. Preparations for its construction began in summer 1892. The cost of the whole monument, including the purchase of land and the construction of the access road was estimated at 800,000 gold marks; in the end it cost 833,000 gold marks or, according to other sources, as much as 1,000,000 gold marks.

Around 13,000 cubic metres (460,000 cu ft) of brickwork was built and 3,000 metres (9,800 ft) of stairway. On 18 October 1896 the monument was inaugurated in the presence of Emperor William II and Empress Augusta Victoria during the opening ceremony in which between 15,000 and 20,000 people took part.

In the Weimar Republic, the emperor had abdicated, so the monument's 25th anniversary passed without being marked. In 1921 a memorial tablet in honour of those who had fallen in the First World War was added. Not until 1926 did the monument become a focal point again when the national associations held a "German Day" here.

In 2000, the monument itself was restored and it was planned to start the renovation of the surrounding terrace and café in 2013, preceded by replacement of areas of the terrace that had been destroyed in 1946 when British troops blew up a wartime underground production facility.

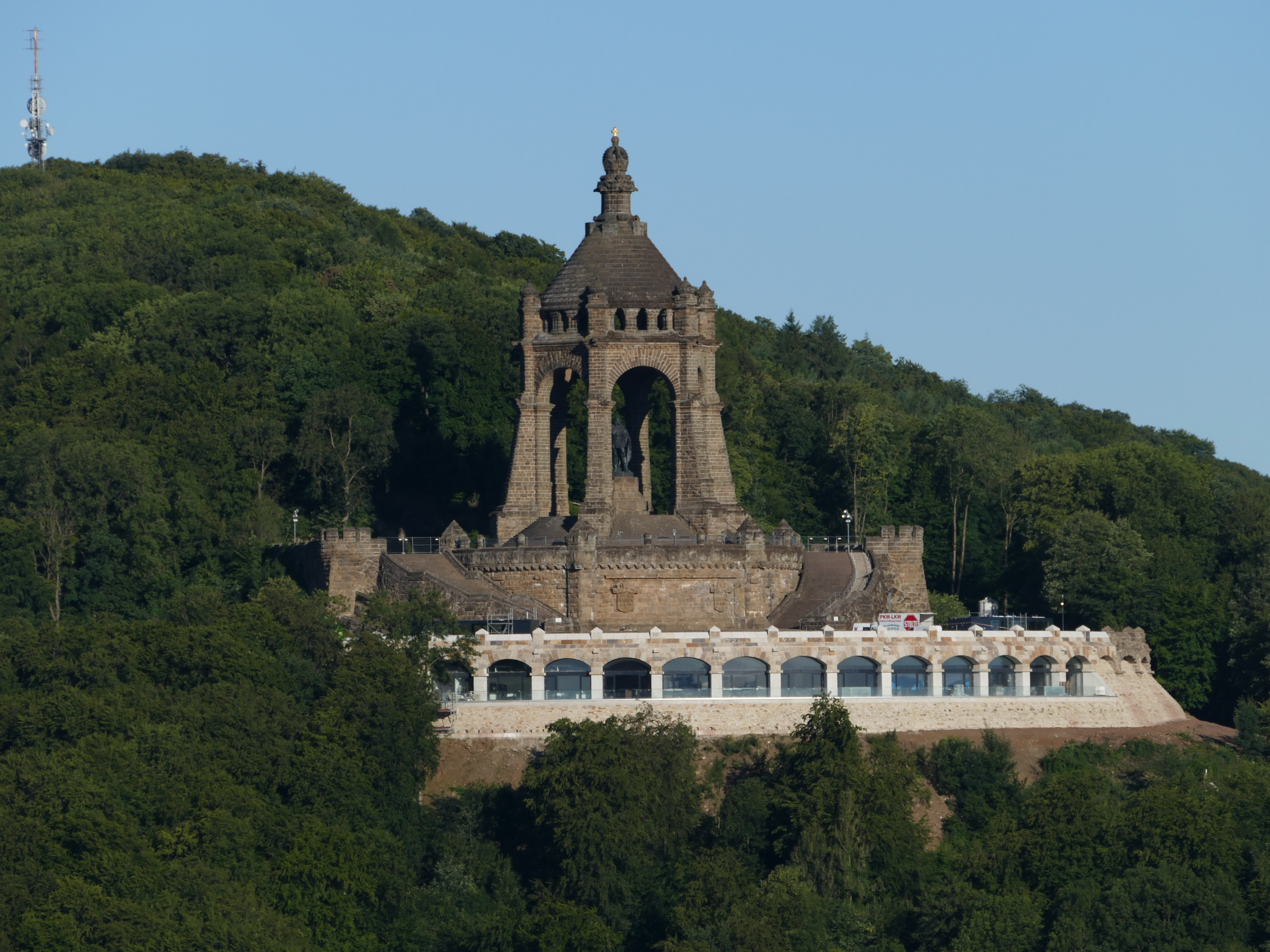
Monument with rebuilt ring terrace, 2018

From 2013 to 2018 the monument was restored and the area remodelled based on a new visitor concept by architect Peter Bastian from Münster. A restaurant and exhibition room were built in the ring terrace of the monument. After the rebuilding the monument was ceremonially re-opened on 8 July 2018.

== Views ==
There are frequently good views from the Emperor William Monument of the town of Porta Westfalica, the North German Plain and of the Weser Hills on the other side of the gorge.

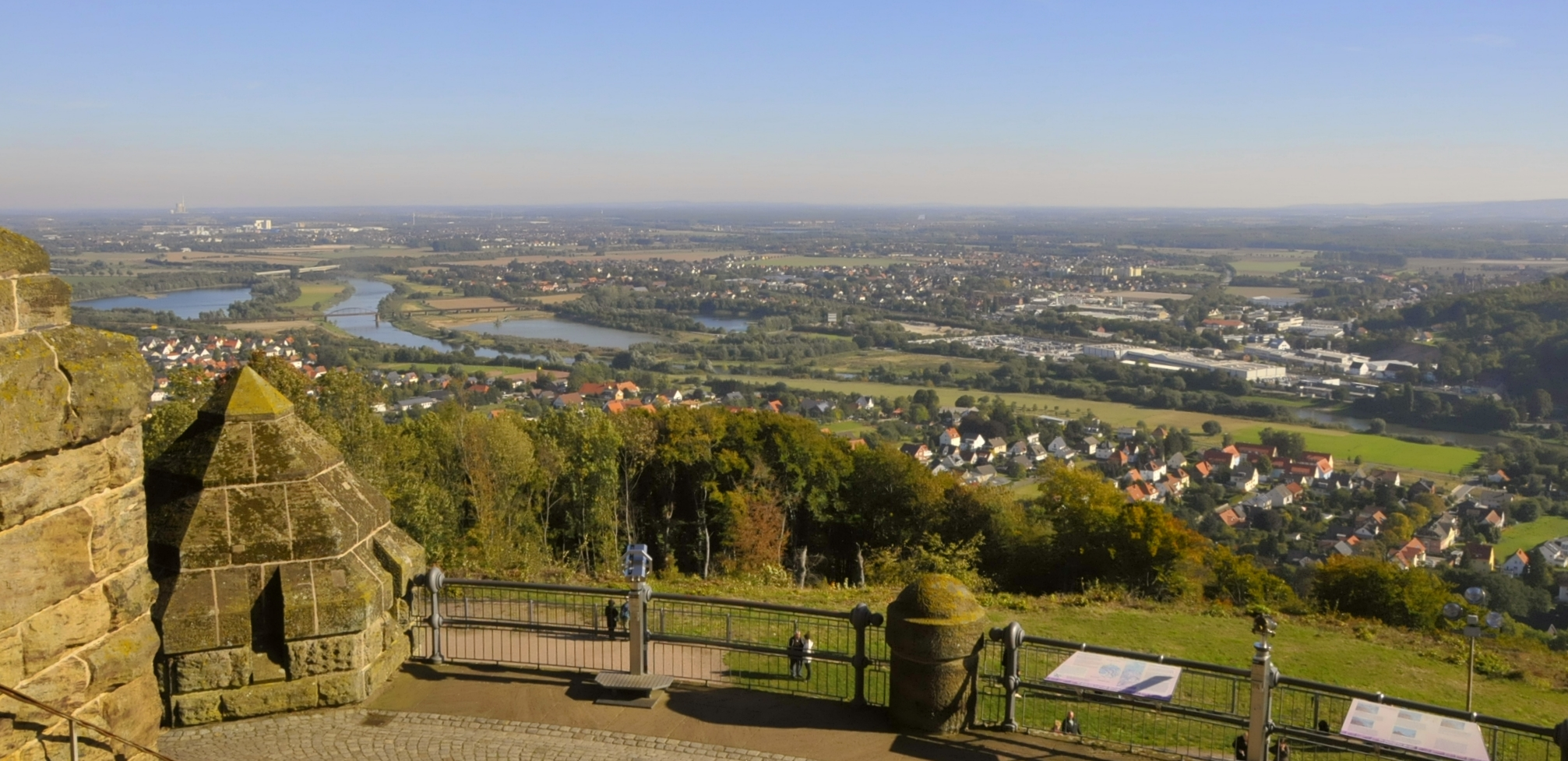
Looking northeast towards Barkhausen (foreground), the River Weser, the Green Bridge (old railway bridge), the B 65 bridge (behind) and the village of Neesen on the other side of the river Weser

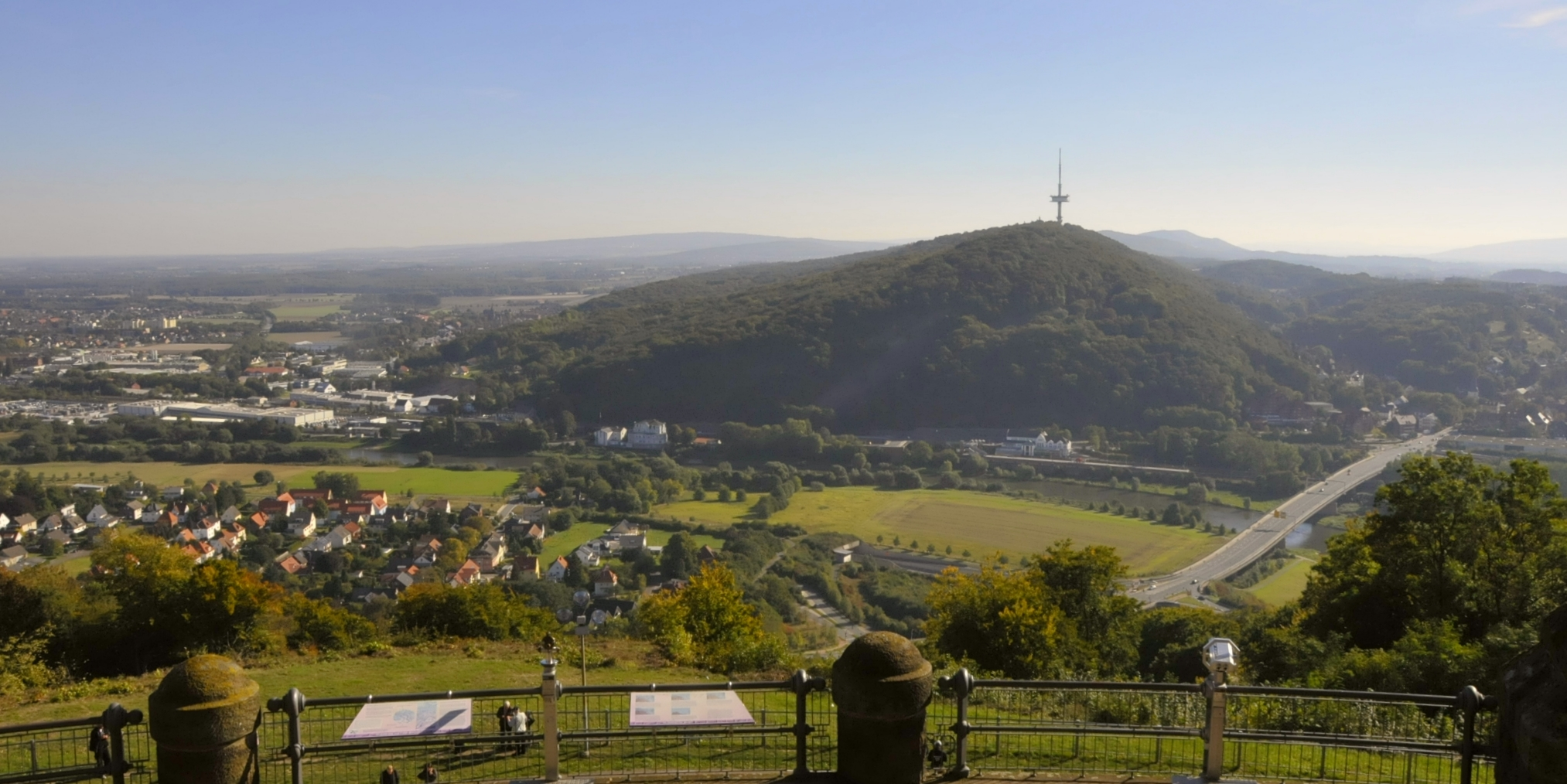
Looking east towards Barkhausen (foreground), the B 61 (Portastraße) bridge over the Weser, the Jakobsberg Transmission Tower (Weser Hills) and the villages of Lerbeck (by the wood) and Neesen (left) on the far side of the Weser

== Literature ==
- Fred Kaspar: "Das Kaiserdenkmal an der Porta-Westfalica". (PDF; 1,4 MB) In: Denkmalpflege in Westfalen-Lippe. January 2007, ISSN 0947-8299, p. 19–21.
- "Die Preisbewerbung für das Kaiser Wilhelm Denkmal der Provinz Westfalen". In: Centralblatt der Bauverwaltung. 10th annual issue, 1890, No. 37, pp. 387–389 and No. 38, pp. 397–398.
- W. Fricke: Die Porta Westfalica und ihr Kaiser-Denkmal. (Commemorative publication for the inauguration of the monument). T. T. Bruns Verlag, Minden i. W., 1896.
- Küster: "Das Kaiser Wilhelm-Denkmal auf dem Wittekindberge an der Porta Westfalica". In: Centralblatt der Bauverwaltung. 16th annual issue, No. 43 (24 October 1896), urn:nbn:de:kobv:109-opus-29813, pp. 469–471.
- Reinhard Neumann: "Die Teilnahme der Minden-Ravensberger Posaunenchöre bei der Denkmalseinweihung an der Porta Westfalica". In: Jahrbuch für westfälische Kirchengeschichte, Vol. 100, 2005, pp. 305–329
