= Wesergebirge =

Hill chain in Germany

Weser Hills (Wesergebirge)
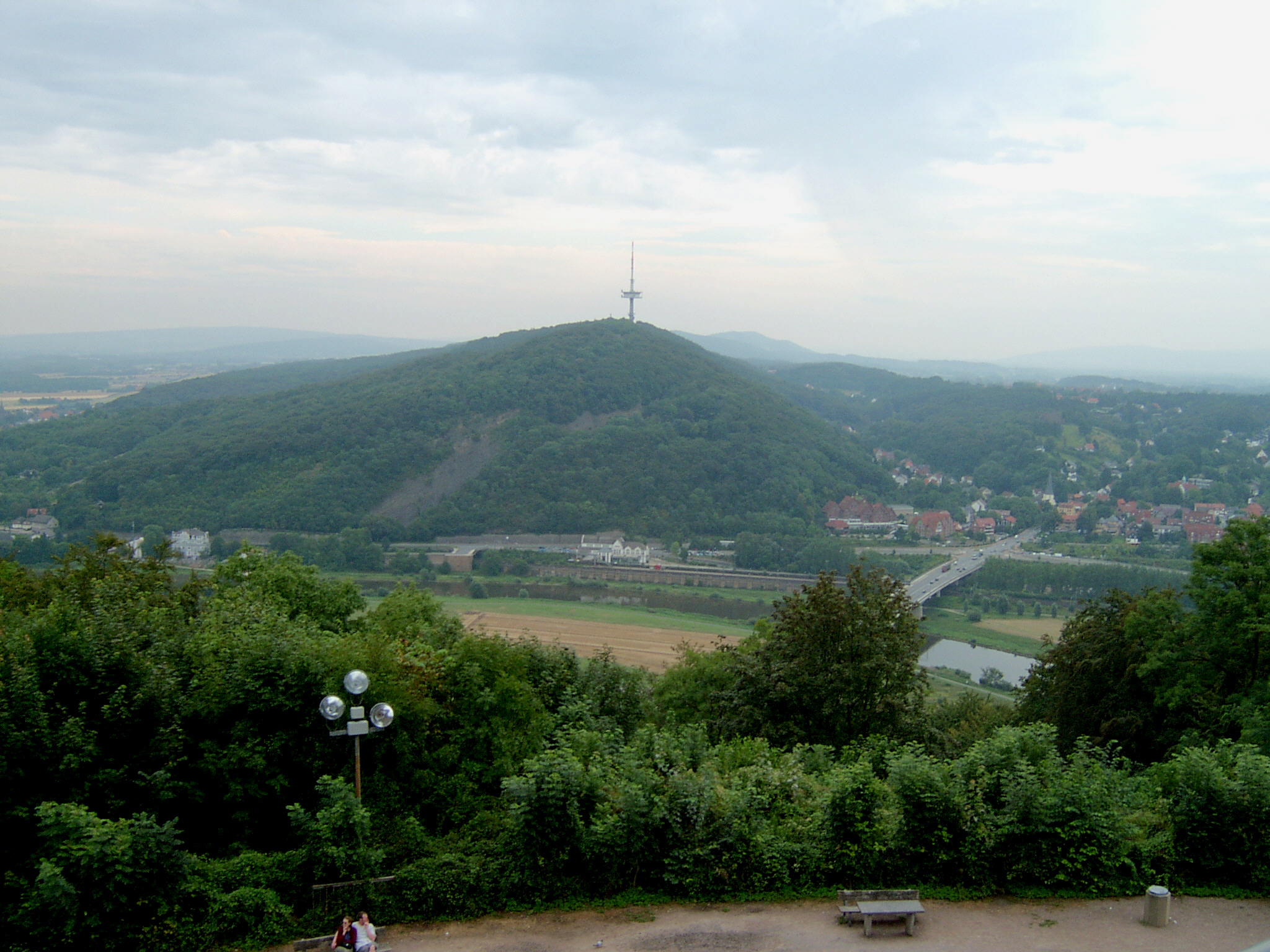
- View from the Kaiser Wilhelm Monument (Wittekindsberg, Wiehen Hills) over Porta Westfalica to the Jakobsberg (Wesergebirge)

Highest point
- Peak: Möncheberg
- Elevation: 326.1 m (1,070 ft)
- Coordinates: 52°13′N 9°5′E

Dimensions
- Length: 100 km (62 mi)

Geography
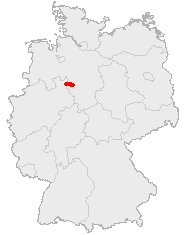
- Location of the Weser Hills
- Country: Germany
- Region(s): North Rhine-Westphalia, Lower Saxony

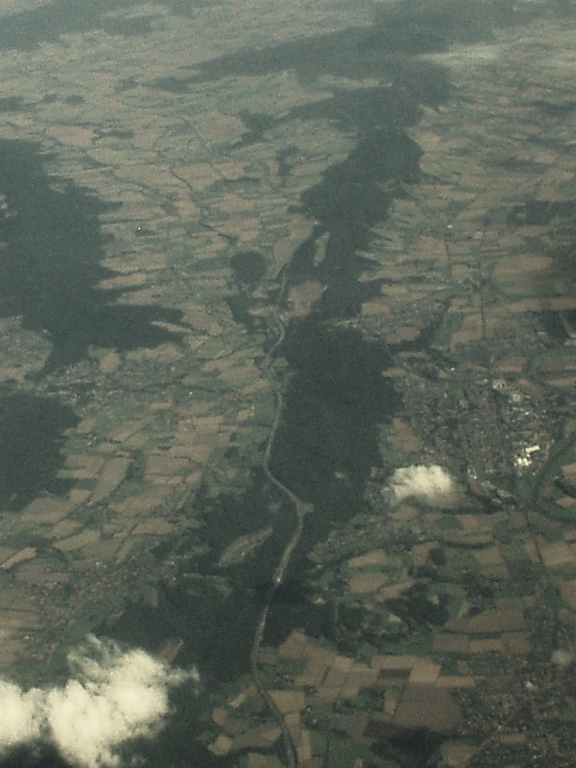
The Weser Hills seen from the west. In the left foreground Bad Eilsen and behind that the Bückeberge; in the right foreground Rinteln with a few meanders of the Weser river (right margin). The background shows a few more forested elevations of the Weser Uplands.

The Weser Hills (Wesergebirge), also known in German as the Weserkette ("Weser Chain"), form a low hill chain, up to 326.1 m above sea level (NN), in the Weser Uplands in the German states of North Rhine-Westphalia and Lower Saxony.

The thickly wooded Weser ridge is one of the northern outliers of the German Central Uplands on the southern edge of the North German Plain and forms part of the TERRA.vita Nature Park in the west and Weser Uplands Schaumburg-Hameln Nature Park in the east.

The Weser Hills are widely known because of Schaumburg Castle which stands on the Nesselberg (c. 225 m above NN) in the Schaumburg district of the town of Rinteln, and is the emblem of Schaumburg Land.

== Geography ==
The Weser Hills cross the counties of Minden-Lübbecke, Schaumburg and Hameln-Pyrmont in a roughly east–west direction, from the town of Porta Westfalica and the Westphalian Gap in the west past Rinteln to Hessisch Oldendorf in the east, where they transition seamlessly to the Süntel, a ridge of similar height running from northwest to southeast. They form part of the perimeter of the Weser Uplands and thus also the German Central Uplands which lie south of the North German Plain.

North of the Weser Hills there are only a few hills of the Calenberg Uplands, such as the nearby ridges of Harrl and Bückeberge. To the west, on the other side of the Porta Westfalica, the chain continues as the Wiehen Hills, geologically of similar formation, reaching Bramsche (northwest of Osnabrück).

South of the Weser Hills, and roughly parallel to them, flows the River Weser, from Hessisch-Oldendorf in the east, through Rinteln, towards Vlotho in the west, before turning northeast to the town of Porta Westfalica. These northern areas around the Upper Weser Valley, south of the hills are an old area of settlement, which was protected by Schaumburg Castle on the hill of Nesselberg. From the water gap at Porta Westfalica - the Westphalian Gap - the river swings north in order to reach the southern part of the North German Plain. North of the hills are the upper reaches of the Aue (also called the Bückeburger Aue) that run roughly east to west.

== Hills ==
The Wesergebirge is a chain of about two dozen hills that are arranged one after another in a ridge and which reach a height of 326.1 m above NN at the Möncheberg in the east. In its centre section, west of the A 2 motorway, they reach a maximum height of 278 m at the Wülpker Egge and a height of 235.2 m at the westernmost hill of the Weser chain, the Jakobsberg, which is located east of Porta Westfalica and on which the Jakobsberg transmission tower stands.

The hills and elevations of the Wesergebirge, as seen from west to east, are given below together with their heights in metres above Normalnull (NN) :

- Jakobsberg (235,2 m), with Jakobsberg Telecommunication Tower, Schlageter Monument and Porta Kanzel; north-northeast of the town of Porta Westfalica by the Porta Westfalica gorge
- Königsberg (c. 225 m); northeast of Porta Westfalica
- Roter Brink (c. 225 m), and Nammer Lager; south-southwest of Nammen
- Lohfelder Berg (215,2 m); northeast of Lohfeld
- Nammer Klippe (248,8 m); nature reserve; south of Nammen
- Nammer Kopf (266,3 m), and the Nammer Klippe, nature reserve; south-southeast of Nammen
- Wülpker Egge (c. 278 m), with a quarry; south of Wülpke
- Rote Klippe (c. 220 m), with a quarry; south of Kleinenbremen
- Papenbrink (303 m), with transmission facility and a quarry; north-northwest of Todenmann
- Lange Wand (320,1 m); in the Hainholz State Forest northeast of Todenmann
- Frankenburg-Berg (c. 235 m), and ruins of the Frankenburg; spur of the Langen Wand north of Rinteln-Todenmann
- Luhdener Klippe (c. 300 m), and the 19.8 m high Klippe Tower; north-northeast of Rinteln
- Hirschkuppe (250,1 m); northeast of Rinteln
- Messingsberg (270,1 m), with a quarry; north-northeast of Rinteln-Steinbergen
- Westendorfer Egge (c. 295 m), with a quarry; north-northeast of Rinteln-Westendorf
- Oberberg (325,2 m), and the Springsteinen; north of Rinteln-Schaumburg
- Heutzeberg (225,5 m); spur of the Oberberg north of Schaumburg
- Nesselberg (c. 225 m), and Schaumburg Castle on a spur of the Möncheberg east of Schaumburg
- Möncheberg (326,1 m), and the Paschenburg Guest House between Schaumburg and Hessisch Oldendorf-Rohdental

== Panorama ==
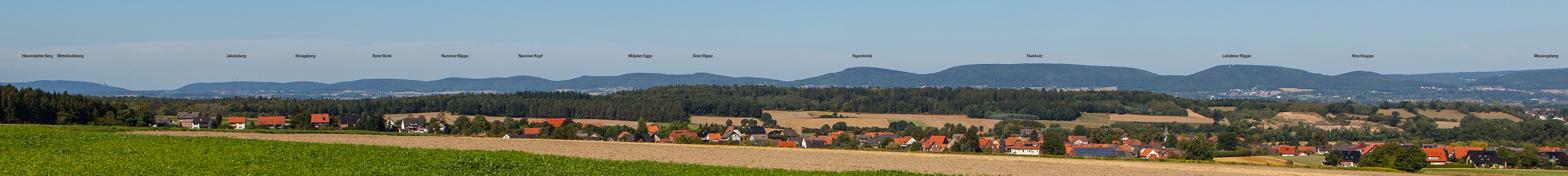

== Towns and villages ==
- Auetal (north)
- Bad Eilsen (north)
- Bückeburg (north)
- Heeßen (north)
- Hessisch Oldendorf (south)
- Minden (north)
- Porta Westfalica (south, west and north)
- Rinteln (south)
- Vlotho (southwest)

== Literature ==
Bundesanstalt für Landeskunde und Raumforschung: Geographische Landesaufnahme 1:200000. Naturräumliche Gliederung Deutschlands. Die naturräumlichen Einheiten auf Blatt 85 Minden. Bad Godesberg 1959
