= TERRA.vita Nature Park =

Nature park in Germany

Coordinates: 52°16′05″N 8°21′18″E

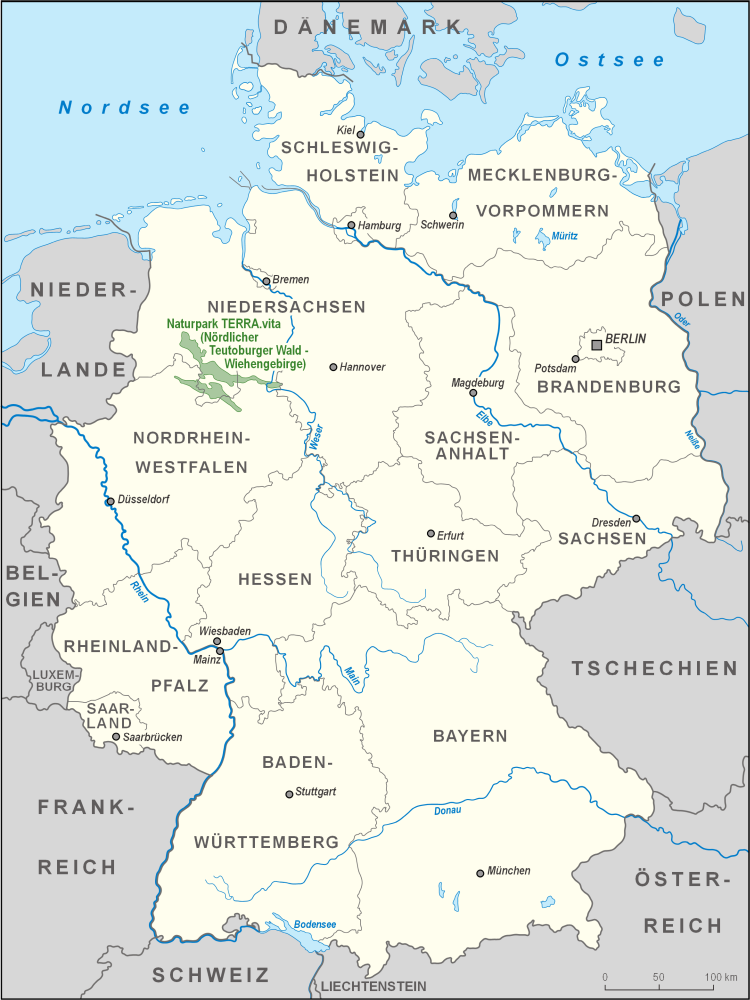
Location of the TERRA.vita Nature Park

The TERRA.vita Nature Park (German: Naturpark TERRA.vita) is located in the German states of Lower Saxony and North Rhine-Westphalia and is divided into northern and southern areas. The park is also known as the Osnabrück Land Nature Park and sometimes by its old name of North Teutoburg Forest-Wiehen Hills Nature Park.

The woodlands of the Nature Park comprise about 70% of its total area.

== The Nature Park ==
=== Northern area ===
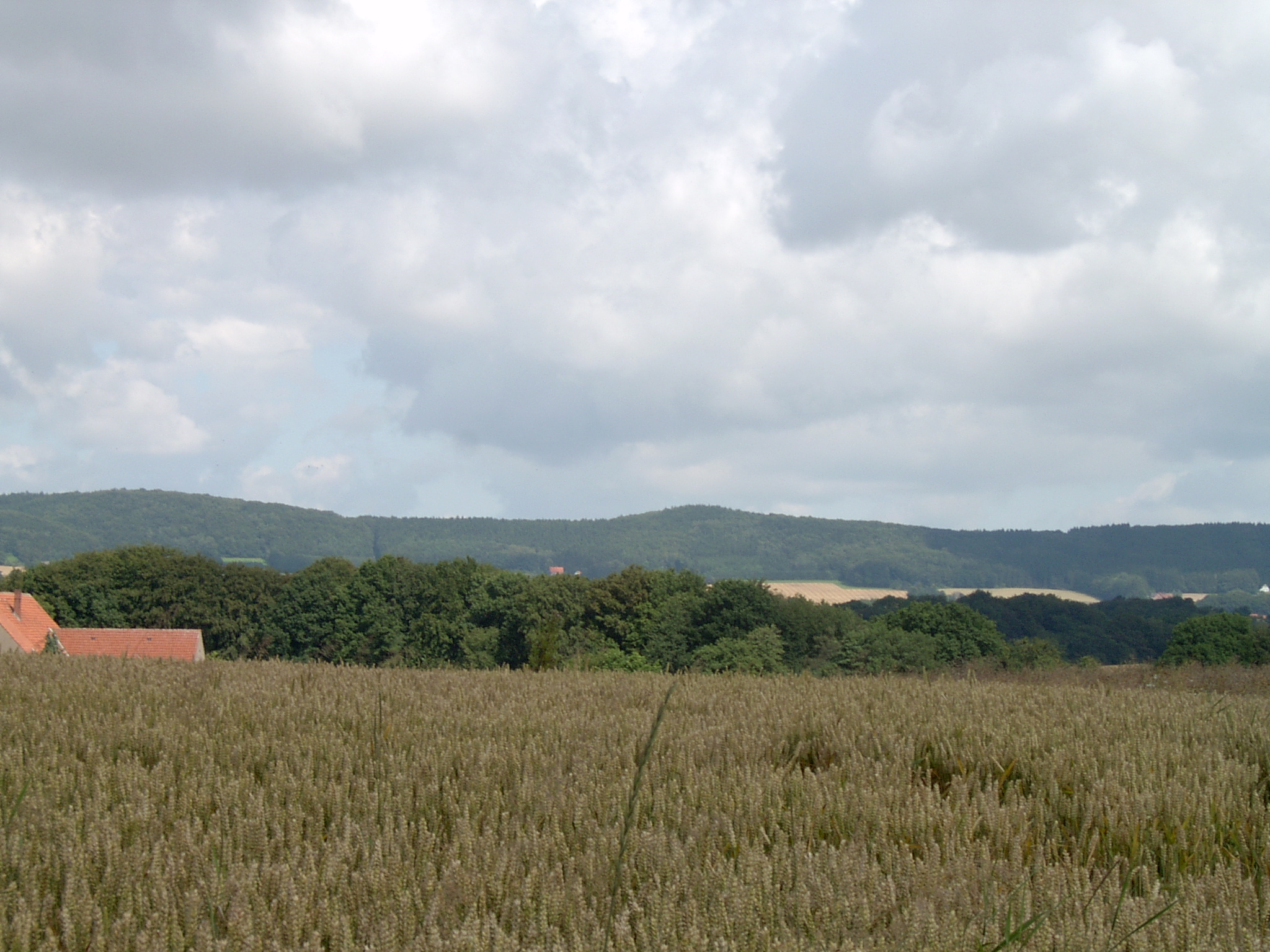
The Wiehen Hills

The northern part of the nature park begins in the Emsland near Herzlake and extends from there over the southern fringes of the Oldenburger Münsterland and Osnabrück Land in a southeast direction over the Ankum Heights to Bramsche. From there it widens out north of Osnabrück over the Wiehen Hills eastwards and then over the gorge of Porta Westfalica, continuing further to the east as far as the Bückeburg, which lies east of the Weser and north of the Wesergebirge; the park area thus extends into the northwestern part of the Wesergebirge.

=== Southern area ===
The southern part of the nature park lies in the northern Teutoburg Forest. It starts east of Hörstel and runs through the Tecklenburg Land and Bad Iburg in a southeasterly direction to Bielefeld.

== Hill ranges ==
- Teutoburg Forest
- Wiehen Hills
- Wesergebirge

== Neighbouring nature park ==
East of Bückeburg it meets the Weser Uplands Schaumburg-Hamelin Nature Park. Southeast of Bielefeld it runs into the Teutoburg Forest / Eggegebirge Nature Park.

== See also ==
- List of nature parks in Germany
