= Jakobsberg Telecommunication Tower =

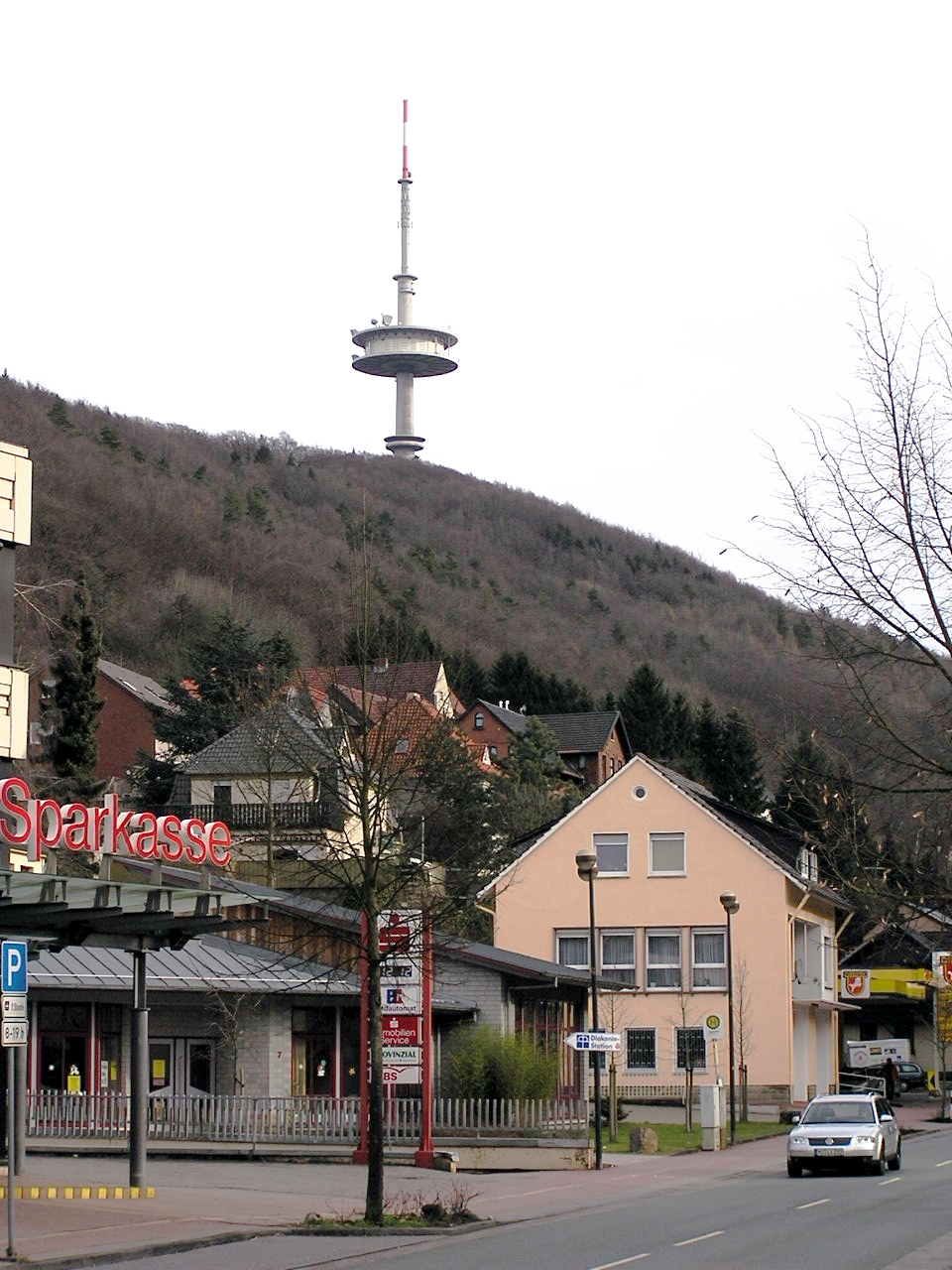
- Jakobsberg Telecommunication Tower

- Location within North Rhine-Westphalia
- Location: Jakobsberg
- Tower height: 142 m (466 ft)
- Coordinates: 52.24175°N 8.93605°E
- Built: May 1, 1974

Jakobsberg Telecommunication Tower is a 142-metre-tall TV tower built of reinforced concrete on the 238-metre-high elevated Jakobsberg near Porta Westfalica. Jakobsberg Telecommunication Tower was built May 1, 1974 and September 28, 1978 as replacement for a small telecommunication tower also equipped with an observation deck, which was built in 1952 on the site of the former Bismarck column, erected in 1902. Jakobsberg Telecommunication Tower is equipped with a room for technical equipment in a height of 50 metres and an observation deck in a height of 23.25 metres. Its main purpose is the transmission of television and radio signals, since 2006 the television signals are sent in DVB-T. For access to the observation deck, there is a stairway running like a srewline around the tower. This stairway gives the lowest sections of Jakobsberg Telecommunication Tower, which is property of Deutsche Telekom, its characteristic design.
