= Porta Westfalica =

- Town
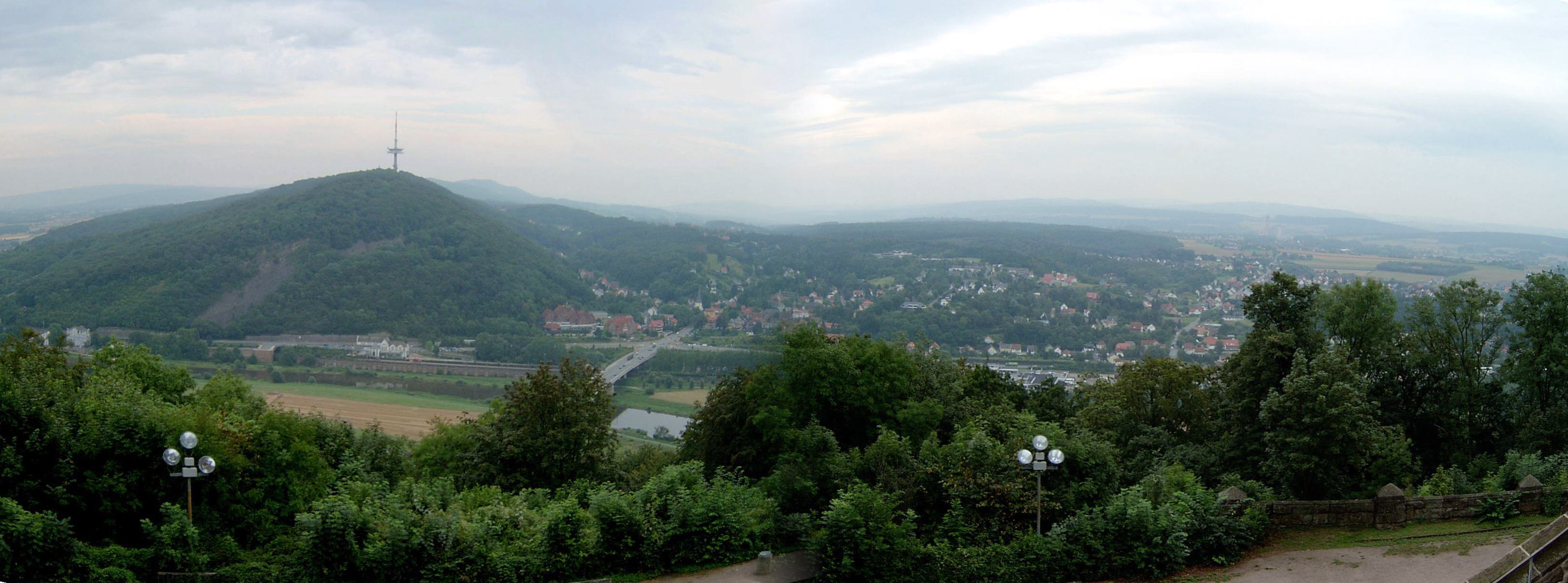
- View over Porta Westfalica to the Weser hills

- Flag Coat of arms

- Location of Porta Westfalica within Minden-Lübbecke district
- Interactive map of Porta Westfalica
- Location within Germany Location within North Rhine-Westphalia
- Coordinates: 52°13′N 8°56′E
- Country: Germany
- State: North Rhine-Westphalia
- Admin. region: Detmold
- District: Minden-Lübbecke
- Subdivisions: 15

Government
  - Mayor (2020–25): <vacant>

Area
  - Total: 105.22 km^{2} (40.63 sq mi)
- Elevation: 46–303 m (151–994 ft)

Population (2025-12-31)
  - Total: 36,502
  - Density: 346.91/km^{2} (898.50/sq mi)
- Time zone: UTC+01:00 (CET)
  - Summer (DST): UTC+02:00 (CEST)
- Postal codes: 32457
- Dialling codes: 0571, 05706, 05722, 05731, 05751
- Vehicle registration: MI
- Website: www.portawestfalica.de

Porta Westfalica (German: [ˈpɔʁta vɛstˈfaːlɪka]) is a town in the district of Minden-Lübbecke, in North Rhine-Westphalia, Germany.

The name "Porta Westfalica" is Latin and means "gate to Westphalia". Coming from the north, the gorge is the entry to the region of Westphalia. The name was coined by scholars of the 19th century.

== History ==
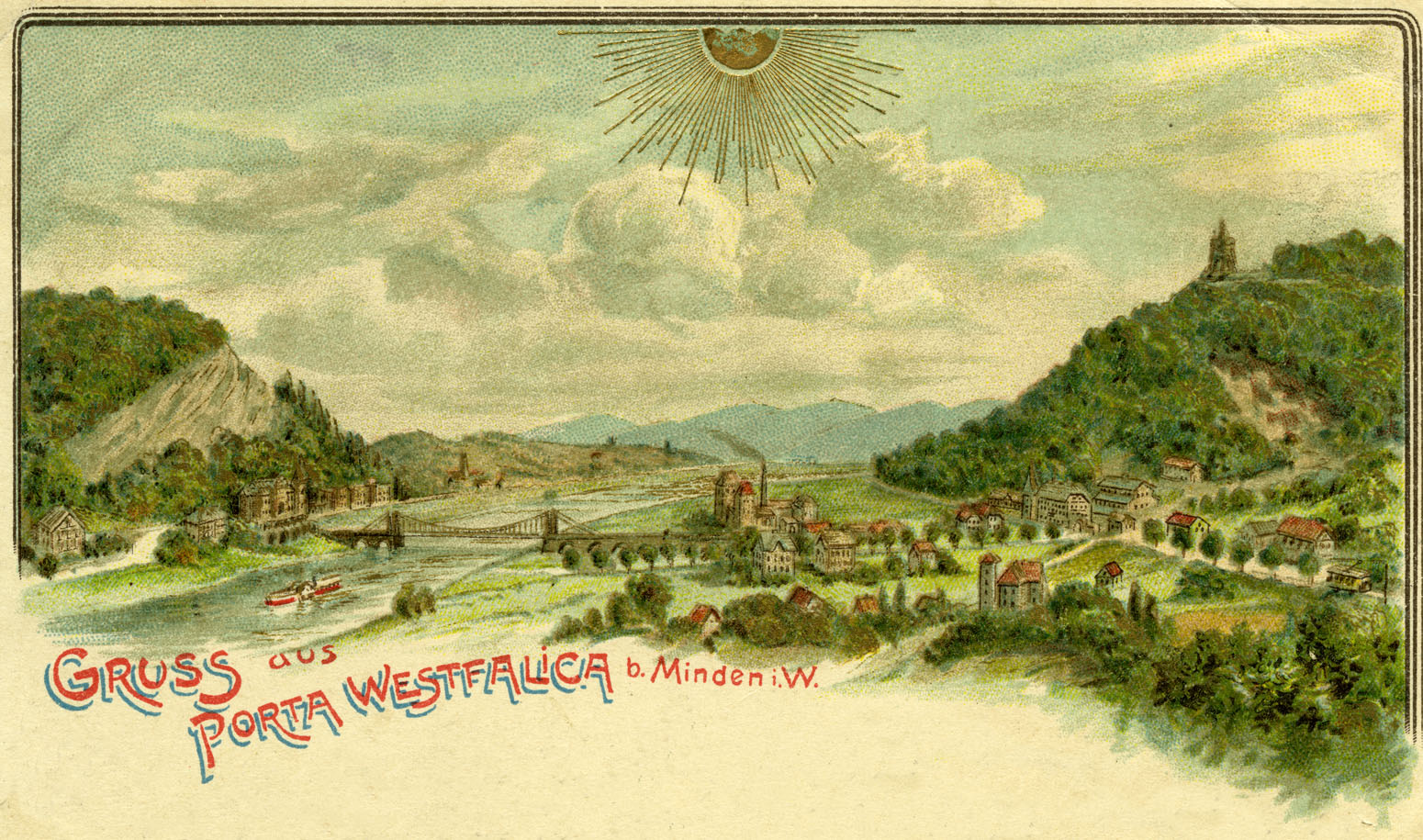
Porta Westfalica on a postcard from 1904

The town Porta Westfalica was established in 1973 by merging fifteen villages surrounding the gorge. The centre of the modern town is the former village of Hausberge, which was first mentioned in 1096.

The Emperor William Monument was erected near the town by the then Prussian Province of Westphalia between 1892 and 1896 The monument, which is around 88 metres high, is classified as one of Germany's national monuments.

From 18 March 1944 until 1 April 1945 a concentration camp was established in the Barkhausen quarter. From 1 February 1945 until 1 April 1945 a camp was used in the Hausberge quarter. In the Lerbeck quarter also was a concentration camp in use from 1 October 1944 until 1 April 1945. In the Neesen quarter was a location for the forced labour for some of the inmates. All of these camps were subcamps of the Neuengamme concentration camp.

On 10 January 2015, Belgian footballer Junior Malanda died in a car accident near the town, aged 20.

== Geography ==
Porta Westfalica is situated on the right bank of the Weser (except for the Barkhausen quarter), near the Porta Westfalica gorge, where the river runs through the passage between the mountain chains of the Wiehen Hills in the west and the Weser Uplands in the east. The gorge appears like a gate to the region Westphalia, which lies to the south of it. It is overlooked by the Jakobsberg and Wittekindsberg hills.

=== Neighbouring places ===
- Bad Oeynhausen
- Bückeburg
- Minden
- Rinteln
- Vlotho

=== Division of the town ===
The town of Porta Westfalica consists of 15 districts:

- Hausberge (5,064 inhabitants)
- Lohfeld (1,350 inhabitants)
- Barkhausen (4,253 inhabitants)
- Neesen (2,319 inhabitants)
- Lerbeck (3,727 inhabitants)
- Nammen (2,208 inhabitants)
- Wülpke (606 inhabitants)
- Kleinenbremen (2,245 inhabitants)
- Eisbergen (3,401 inhabitants)
- Veltheim (2,539 inhabitants)
- Möllbergen (1,643 inhabitants)
- Holtrup (1,048 inhabitants)
- Vennebeck (983 inhabitants)
- Costedt (508 inhabitants)
- Holzhausen (4,284 inhabitants)

== Population ==
Historical population

Year	Pop.	±% p.a.
1965	33,783	—
1970	34,235	+0.27%
1975	34,946	+0.41%
1980	34,532	−0.24%
1985	33,193	−0.79%
1990	35,061	+1.10%
1995	35,794	+0.41%

Year	Pop.	±% p.a.
2000	36,182	+0.22%
2005	36,175	−0.00%
2010	35,122	−0.59%
2015	35,430	+0.17%
2020	35,734	+0.17%
2025	36,502	+0.43%

Source: Landesdatabank Nordrhein-Westfalen

== Buildings and structures ==
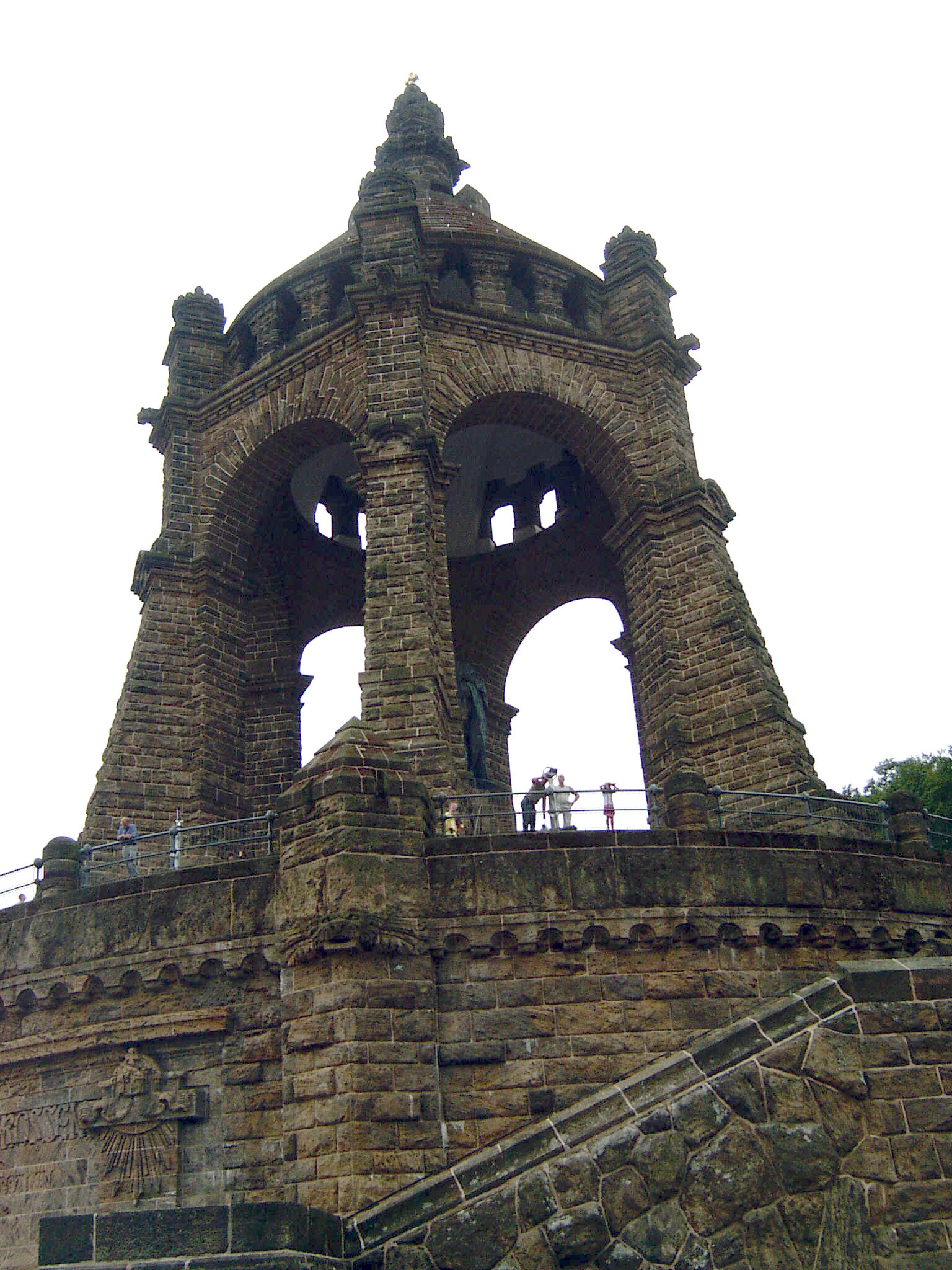
Monument of Kaiser Wilhelm I

- Jakobsberg Telecommunication Tower, a TV tower with an observation deck
- Monument to Kaiser Wilhelm I, above the gorge, near the village Barkhausen
- Wittekindsburg, remains of an Iron Age "oppidum" (3rd – 1st century BC) and Saxon-Frankish fort (8th/9th century AD), in the Wiehen Hills near Barkhausen

== Twin towns – sister cities ==
Porta Westfalica is twinned with:

- Friedrichshain-Kreuzberg (Berlin), Germany
- Waterloo, United States

== See also ==
- List of subcamps of Neuengamme
