= Porta Westfalica (gorge) =

Gorge and water gap in North Rhine-Westphalia, Germany

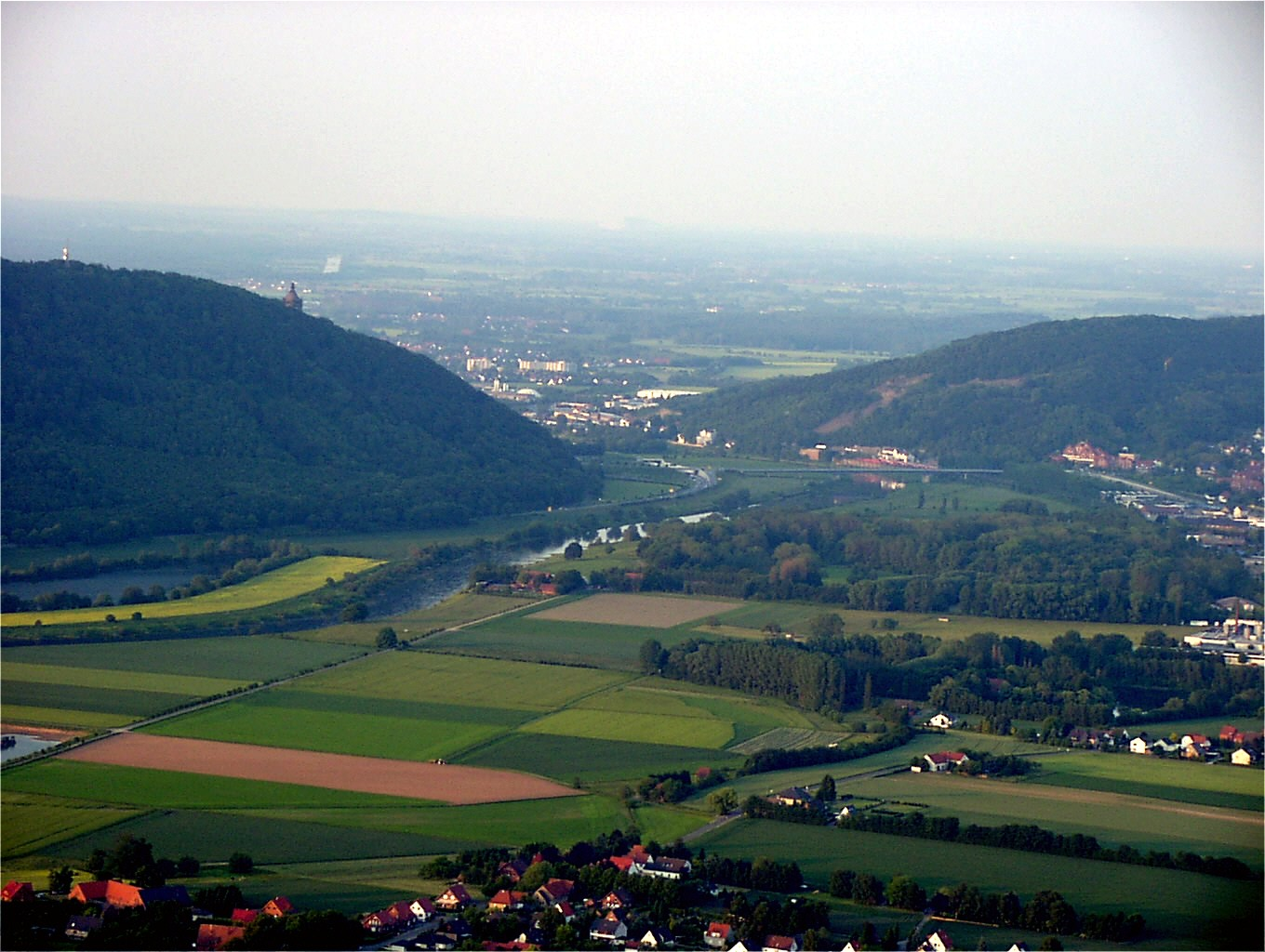
- Porta Westfalica view from south to north

- Location within North Rhine-Westphalia Location within Germany
- Traversed by: Weser River

Location
- Range: Junction of Wiehengebirge (Wittekindsberg) and Wesergebirge (Jakobsberg)
- Coordinates: 52.244°N 8.91961°E

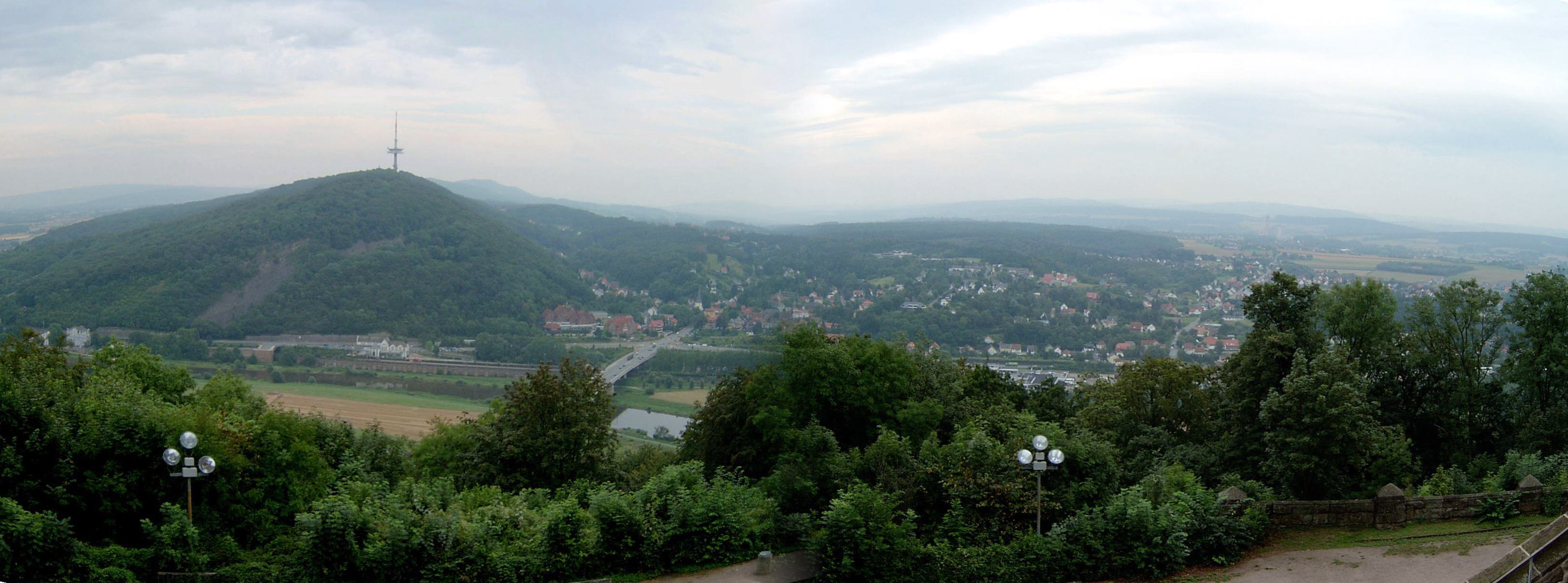
The Porta Westfalica

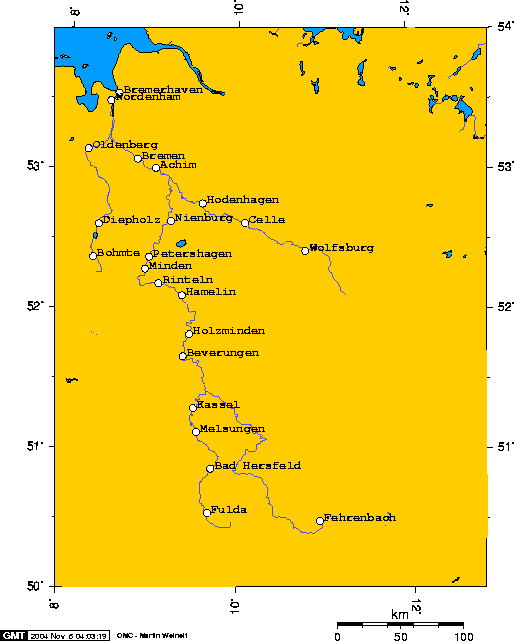
Weser watershed

The Porta Westfalica (German pronunciation: [ˈpɔʁta vɛstˈfaːlɪka]), also known as the Westphalian Gap, is a gorge and water gap where the Weser river breaks through the passage between the mountain chains of the Wiehen Hills in the west and the Weser Hills (part of the Weser Uplands) in the east. It is located in the district of Minden-Lübbecke in North Rhine-Westphalia, Germany.

Since 1973, Porta Westfalica is also the name of a town, established by merging fifteen villages surrounding the gorge. Since 2006, it is a national geotope.

The name "Porta Westfalica" is a Latin term that means "Gate to Westphalia". Coming from the north, the gorge is the entry to the region of Westphalia. Despite its Latin name, the term was not coined in Roman Empire times, but by scholars in the 19th century.

High above the gorge on the west side is a large six-sided stone structure that can be seen from a considerable distance; this is the Emperor William Monument, erected in honour of Emperor William I of Germany and dedicated in 1896.
