= List of German–Swedish wars =

List of wars between Germans and Swedes

This is a List of German–Swedish wars. This list primarily features historically German states such as the Teutonic Order, the Holy Roman Empire and Brandenburg-Prussia. Ever since its initial unification in 1871, Germany has never been at war with Sweden, with the latter country declaring neutrality in both World Wars.

Swedish victory - 9
German victory - 6
Another result - 5

War	Sweden and allies	Germans and allies	Treaty	Result
Eric the Victorious' invasion of the Holy Roman Empire	Sweden; Denmark	Holy Roman Empire	Unknown	German victory: Failure of the invasion; Looting of Stade; Many prisoners and loot taken by the Swedes.
Second Folkung Uprising	Sweden	Folkung: Danes; Germans	Unknown	Swedish victory: Execution of Filip Knutsson
Kalundborg War	Sweden; Holstein	Denmark; Lübeck; Rostock; Hamburg; Stralsund; Wismar; Greifswald	Treaty of Helsingborg; Treaty of Varberg	Swedish-Holsteiner victory
Expedition to Estonia (1343)	Sweden	Denmark; Teutonic Order	Unknown	Indecisive: Swedish troops did not arrive quickly enough to engage in combat
War in Gotland (1398)	Sweden	Teutonic Order	Capitulation of 1398	Teutonic victory: Gotland is conquered by the Teutonic Order.
War in Gotland (1403–1404)	Sweden	Teutonic Order	Truce of Slite 1404; Truce of Visby 1404	Teutonic victory: Gotland remains in Teutonic hands until it is purchased by the Kalmar Union.
First campaign to Livonia (1473-1475)	Sweden; Reval	Teutonic Order	Unknown	Indecisive
Second campaign to Livonia (1478)	Sweden; Reval	Teutonic Order	Capitulation in Livonia 1478	Indecisive
Third campaign to Livonia (1485-1486)	Sweden; Reval	Teutonic Order	Peace of Reval 1488	Indecisive
Claus Kurssell's coup	Sweden	German mercenaries	Unknown	Revolutionary failure: Execution of Claus Kursstell
Polish–Swedish War (1626–1629)	Sweden	Poland–Lithuania; Holy Roman Empire	Treaty of Altmark	Swedish victory
Thirty Years War	Sweden; France	Holy Roman Empire	Treaty of Westphalia	Franco–Swedish victory: Wismar, Wollin, Western Pomerania, and Bremen-Verden ceded to Sweden
Torstenson War	Sweden	Denmark; Holy Roman Empire	Second Treaty of Brömsebro (1645)	Swedish victory
First Bremian War	Sweden	Bremen	Treaty of Stade (1654)	Swedish victory
Second Northern War	Sweden	Poland–Lithuania; Denmark–Norway; Habsburg Monarchy; Tsardom of Russia; Brandenburg–Prussia; Dutch Republic	Treaty of Oliva	Swedish victory
Second Bremian War	Sweden	Bremen; Denmark–Norway; Electorate of Brandenburg; Dutch Republic	Treaty of Habenhausen	Bremian victory
Scanian War	Sweden; France	Denmark–Norway; Brandenburg–Prussia; Holy Roman Empire; Dutch Republic	Treaty of Habenhausen	Stalemate: Sweden cedes most of its territory east of the Oder to Brandenburg-Prussia.
Great Northern War (1700-1721)	Sweden	Prussia; Russia; Denmark; Poland-Lithuania	Treaties of Stockholm	Coalition victory
Pomeranian War	Sweden; Russia	Prussia	Treaty of Hamburg (1762)	Prussian victory: Status quo ante bellum
German campaign of 1813 (Part of the Napoleonic Wars)	Sweden; United Kingdom; Russia; Netherlands	Confederation of the Rhine; France; Denmark-Norway		Coalition victory
