= List of wars between Denmark and Sweden =

This is a list of wars between Denmark and Sweden. Broadly construed, it may refer to one of multiple wars which took place between the Kingdom of Sweden and the Kingdom of Denmark (from 1450 in personal union with the Kingdom of Norway) up to 1814:

== Antiquity Mythological wars ==
- Dag the Wise's war against Denmark, c. 300
- Jorund's war against Denmark, c. 400
- Healfdene's invasion of Sweden, c. 480
- Ale's invasion of Sweden, c. 490

== Migration period ==
War	Sweden and allies	Denmark and allies	Result
Swedish slave revolts c. 500	Sweden	Denmark	Danish Victory
Ohthere's Danish Raid, c. 520	Sweden	Denmark	Danish Victory
Battle of Brávellir 750s	Sweden under king Sigurd Ring, Estonians, Finns, Rus people, Bjarmians kings, Curonians, western Geats under Sali the Goth, Valkyries,Berserkers	Denmark under king Harald Wartooth, Wends under the queen and shieldmaiden Vissna, most of the Geats, Anglo-Saxon warriors and kings, Polish Chieftains, Irish Chieftains, and Berserkers	Swedish victory

== Viking Age ==
War	Sweden and allies	Denmark and allies	Result
Anund Uppsale's raid of Sweden c. 800–850's	Sweden	Denmark	Danish Victory
Battle of Fýrisvellir, 986	Sweden	Denmark, Jomsvikings	Swedish victory
Eric the Victorious' invasion of Denmark, 990s (Note: Historicity is uncertain)	Sweden, Poland	Denmark	Swedish victory
Olof Skötkonung's attack for the Danish throne, c. 995–999 (Note: Historicity is uncertain)	Sweden	Denmark	Swedish Victory
Battle of Helgeå, 1026	Sweden, Norway	Denmark, England	Danish Victory
Battle of Stiklestad, 1030	Sweden, Norway	Denmark	Danish Victory
Swedish support for Magnus' invasion of Norway, 1035	Sweden, Norway	Denmark	Swedish Victory

== Middle Ages ==
War	Sweden and allies	Denmark and allies	Result
Svend III Grathe's Swedish raids, 1152–1154	Sweden	Denmark	Danish Victory
Battle of Lena, 1208	Sweden	Denmark	Swedish Victory
Battle of Gestilren, 1210	Sweden	Denmark	Swedish Victory
Battle of Hova, 1275	Sweden	Denmark	Danish Victory
6000-mark war, 1276–1278	Sweden	Denmark	Danish Victory
Battle of Mjölkalånga, 1318	Sweden	Denmark	Swedish Victory
Kalundborg War, 1341–1343	Sweden, Norway, Holstein	Denmark, Lübeck, Hamburg, Rostock, Wismar, Greifswald, and Stralsund	Swedish Victory
Valdemar Atterdag's invasion of Scania, 1360	Sweden	Denmark	Danish Victory
Valdemar Atterdag's invasion of Gotland, 1361	Sweden and the Hanseatic League	Denmark	Danish Victory
First phase of the Danish-Hanseatic War, 1361–1365	Sweden, Norway, Hanseatic League	Denmark	Danish Victory
Second phase of the Danish–Hanseatic War, 1367–1370	Sweden and the Hanseatic League	Denmark	Hanseatic-Swedish victory
Battle of Åsle, 1389	Sweden	Denmark	Danish Victory

== Kalmar Union ==
War	Sweden and allies	Denmark and allies	Result
Engelbrekt rebellion, 1434–1439	Sweden	Kalmar Union	Swedish Victory
War for Norway 1448–1451	Sweden	Denmark	Danish Victory
Krummedige-Tre Rosor feud 1448–1502	Sweden	Denmark	Danish Victory
Dano-Swedish War of 1449–1457	Sweden	Kalmar Union	Danish Victory
Battle of Haraker 1464	Sweden	Kalmar Union	Swedish Victory
Dano-Swedish War of 1470–1471	Sweden	Kalmar Union	Swedish Victory
Battle of Rotebro, 1497	Sweden	Kalmar Union	Danish Victory
War of Deposition against King Hans 1501–1503	Sweden	Kalmar Union	Swedish Victory
Alvsson Rebellion	Sweden	Denmark	Danish Victory
Dano-Swedish War of 1501–1512	Sweden, Lübeck	Kalmar Union	Stalemate
Dano-Swedish War of 1512–1520	Sweden	Kalmar Union	Danish Victory
Swedish War of Liberation 1521–1523	Sweden, Lübeck	Kalmar Union	Swedish Victory

== Early modern period ==
War	Sweden and allies	Denmark and allies	Treaty	Result
Northern Seven Years' War, 1563–1570. See also Livonian War	Sweden	Denmark–Norway, Lübeck, Poland–Lithuania	Treaty of Stettin (1570)	Stalemate
Kalmar War, 1611–1613	Sweden	Denmark–Norway	Treaty of Knäred	Danish Victory
Torstenson War, 1643–1645. Known in Norway as the Hannibal War.	Sweden	Denmark–Norway	Second Treaty of Brömsebro	Swedish Victory
First Karl Gustav War (1657–1658)	Sweden	Denmark–Norway	Treaty of Roskilde	Swedish Victory
Second Karl Gustav War, 1658–1660	Sweden	Denmark–Norway	Treaty of Copenhagen	Danish Victory
Second Bremen War, 1666	Sweden	Denmark–Norway	Treaty of Habenhausen	Danish Victory
Scanian War, 1675–1679	Sweden	Denmark–Norway	Peace of Lund	Stalemate
Great Northern War first Danish Intervention, 1700.	Sweden	Denmark–Norway	Peace of Travendal	Swedish Victory
Great Northern War second Danish Intervention, 1709–1720	Sweden	Denmark–Norway	Treaty of Frederiksborg	Danish Victory
Theatre War 1788–1789	Sweden	Denmark–Norway	None	Stalemate
Dano-Swedish War of 1808–1809	Sweden	Denmark–Norway	Treaty of Jönköping	Stalemate
Dano-Swedish War (1813–1814)	Sweden	Denmark–Norway	Treaty of Kiel	Swedish Victory

== See also ==
- Swedish–Norwegian War (1814)

== Works cited ==
- Sundberg, Ulf (2010). Sveriges krig 1448-1630 [Sweden's wars 1448-1630] (in Swedish). Svenskt militärhistoriskt bibliotek. ISBN 9789185789627.
