= Bremen-Verden campaign =

- Part of the Scanian War and Franco-Dutch War
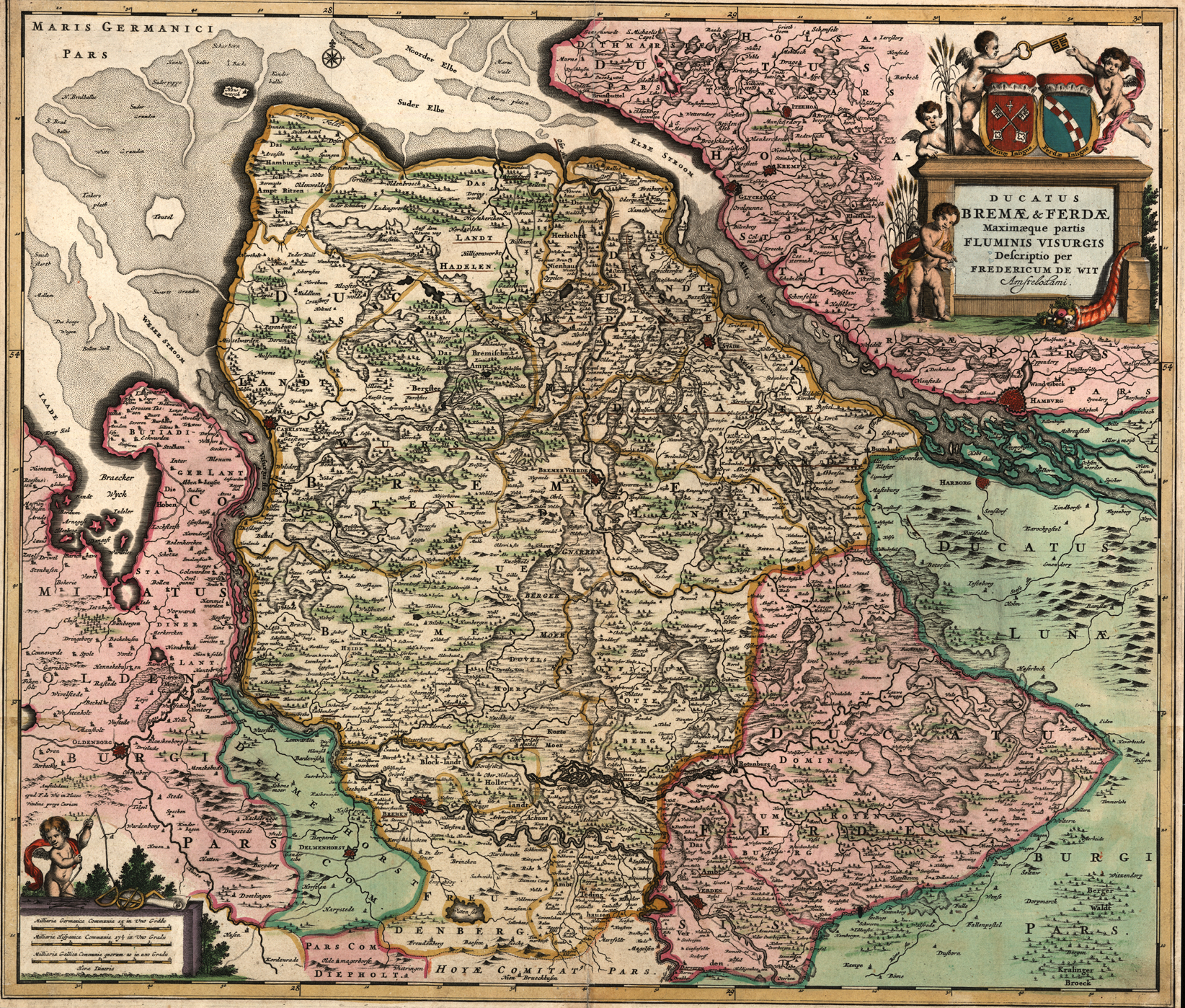
- Duchies of Bremen and Verden in 1655 (1655 copperplate by Frederick de Wit)
Date	15 September 1675 – 13 August 1676
Location	Duchies of Bremen and Verden
Result	Allied victory

Belligerents
(yes) Swedish Empire	Holy Roman Empire; Prince-Bishopric of Münster; Brandenburg-Prussia; Principality of Lüneburg; Denmark–Norway

Commanders and leaders
Henrik Horn	Christoph Bernhard von Galen; George William

Strength
November 1675; 5,600 Swedes in Stade; 800 Swedes in Carlsburg	1675; 4,000 Münster troops 2,800–3,100 Brandenburg troops 2,500 Danes; 3,000 Lüneburg troops 1676; 12,000 men

The Bremen-Verden campaign (German: Bremen-Verdener feldzug) was a conflict during the Northern Wars in Europe. From 15 September 1675 to 13 August 1676 an anti-Swedish coalition comprising Brandenburg-Prussia, the neighbouring imperial princedoms of Lüneburg and Münster, and Denmark-Norway, conquered the Duchies of Bremen and Verden.

Bremen-Verden, a remote outpost of Sweden's Baltic Sea empire, was the third Swedish imperial fief in North Germany granted under the Peace of Westphalia in 1648, alongside Swedish Pomerania and the Barony of Wismar. Following its conquest it remained in allied hands until the end of the war in 1679, but was then fully returned to Sweden in the wake of the Treaties of Nijmegen. For the major warring parties of Sweden, Brandenburg and Denmark, this theatre of war in northwest Germany was only of secondary significance.

== Background ==
After France had invaded the General States in 1672 as retribution for the outcome of the War of Devolution, an alliance formed up against her. The conflict escalated into the Dutch War. In order to relieve her increasingly stretched forces, therefore, France urged its traditional ally, Sweden, to go to war against her enemies, who, in addition to the States General, included the House of Habsburg and the Electorate of Brandenburg. At the end of 1674, a Swedish army under the imperial commander, Carl Gustav Wrangel, invaded the Margraviate of Brandenburg which was militarily almost unprotected, while the Brandenburg army under Elector Frederick William I found itself at war with France. In a short summer campaign in 1675, Frederick William succeeded in defeating the Swedish army and pushing it back to Swedish Pomerania.

Encouraged by the Brandenburg victory, on 17 July 1675 the imperial ban was imposed on the Swedish king in his capacity as an imperial prince in Pomerania, Mecklenburg and Bremen-Verden. A Reichsexekution was declared by the Holy Roman Empire against Sweden. The Westphalian and Upper Saxon Circles were charged with the enforcement of the ban against the Swedes. A little later came the declaration of war by Denmark on Sweden.

In this large-scale war, the Allies, Denmark-Norway and Brandenburg, initially intended to conquer the Swedish possessions in northern Germany, then turn use their full might in the theatres of war in Scania. But with the conquest of Bremen-Verden, located on the southern border of Denmark, Sweden would have secured a potential springboard against Denmark. Another political power factor was that it would give the Swedes opportunities to recruit mercenaries.

The war planning that took place on the Swedish homeland envisaged military victory being achieved through the deployment of the Swedish fleet which was likely to defeat the Danish-Norwegian fleet in the Baltic Sea, thus relieving Sweden's North German possessions, so it could then, in a further step, land on Zealand, the heart of Denmark. Sweden's chances in the Duchy of Bremen-Verden, therefore, lay principally in the strength of her own fleet, which was to have ensured a military victory by dispatching additional troops from the motherland. However, since the Swedish fleet could not sail due to delays in equipment, Bremen-Verden was not reinforced and had to rely on its in-place forces.

Sweden's forces in the Duchy of Bremen-Verden were numerically weak and distributed across several fortified bases. The bulk of the Swedish army was in Stade, Carlsburg and seven other small fortresses. They would only be able to oppose large scale offensive operations with delaying tactics. The Swedish defence plans were based on siege warfare. The number of the fortified places would force her potential opponents, to fight a series of arduous, small sieges, but it also fragmented the troops available to the defenders and prevented them from forming a mobile field army.

== Diplomatic preparations ==
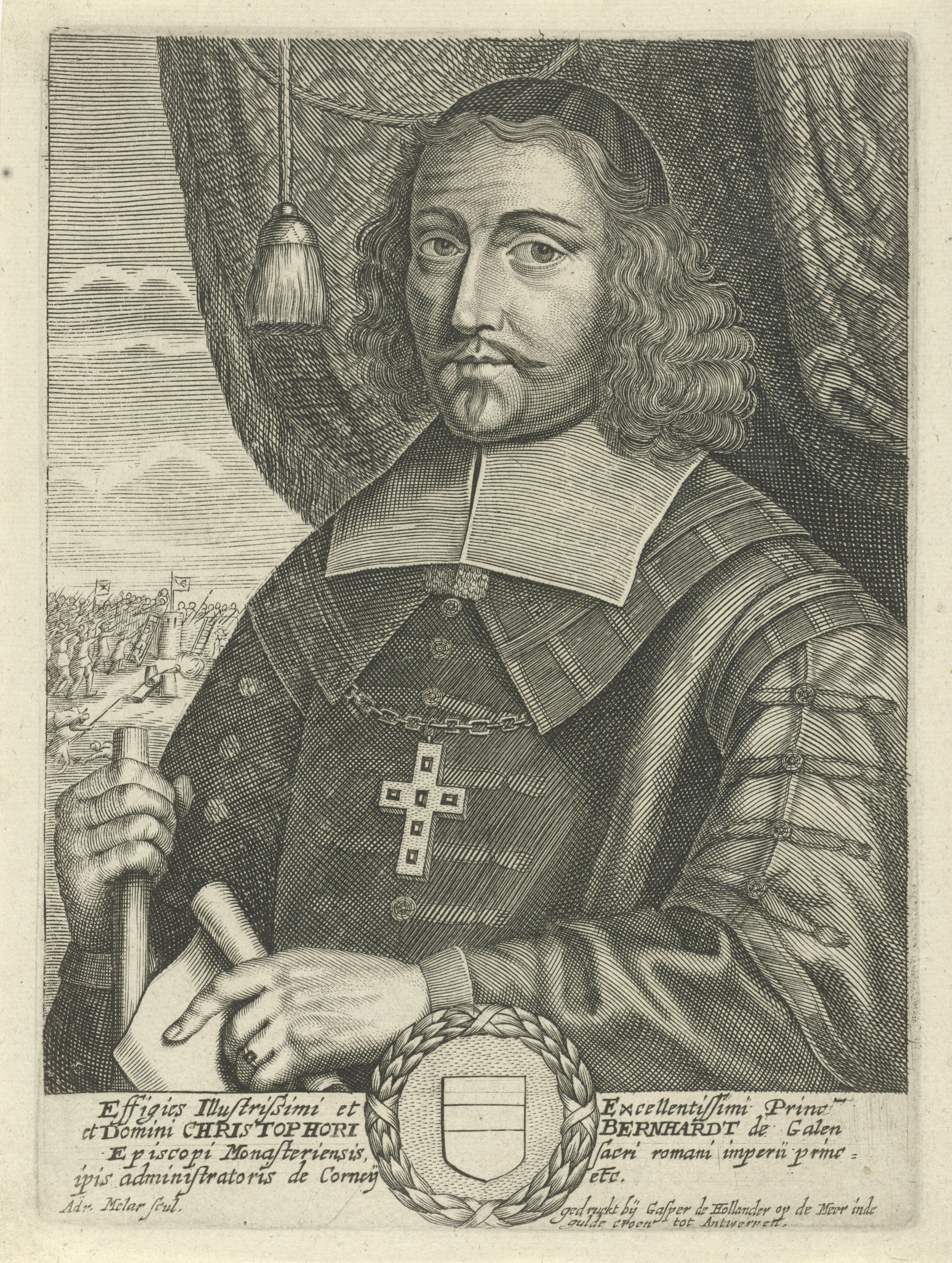
Christoph Bernhard von Galen – temporarily the supreme commander of the allied army

The Roman Catholic Prince-Bishop of Münster, Christoph Bernhard von Galen, who was intent on extending his power and who, until 22 April 1674, sided with France in battle against the Netherlands, signed an agreement on 7 June 1675 with the imperial court in Vienna that obliged him to supply 9,000 troops "to the Emperor and for Imperial Service". As a result of this obligation, the bishop was made to participate in the war against Sweden. On 11/21 September 1675 a treaty of neutrality was signed between the Allies, the Prince-Bishopric of Münster, Denmark and Brandenburg on the one hand and John Frederick of Brunswick-Lüneburg on the other. Brunswick-Lüneburg, which hitherto had been on the Swedish side, therefore, agreed to remain neutral in the upcoming fight against Sweden.

That treaty between the four allies was signed primarily because it was in the political interests of the imperial princes involved, rather than in discharge of their obligation to defend the circle or empire. Thus the execution of the imperial ban was carried out by the respective territorial armies, while the circle troops took no significant part in the fighting.

== Autumn 1675 campaign ==
=== Invasion of Bremen-Verden by the Münster army ===
Chronology:

Autumn 1675 campaign

- 15 September – Invasion of the Münster army of the Amt of Wildeshausen and its further advance via the city of Bremen to Verden
- 28 September – Landing of Brandenburg troops at Carlsburg
- 2 October – Defeat of the Brandenburg force in front of Carlsburg by a Swedish relief force
- 3 October – Capture of Ottersberg by Münster troops
- 4 October – Swedish troops repel a Danish attack on Land Wursten
- 12 October – Capture of Buxtehude by the Allies
- 28 October – Capture of Bremervörde by the Allies
- End October – Allied change of command
- 6–7 November – Unsuccessful Allied attacks on Stade
- Early January – Swedish victory in the Battle of Freiburg
- 22 January – Invasion of Carlsburg by the Allies

Spring 1676 campaign

- Early April – Beginning of the siege of Stade by the Allies
- 13. August – Surrender of the Swedes in Stade

The campaign began on 15 September 1675 in the southwest of the Swedish territory when, according to the reports of the Theatrum Europaeum, about 10,000 men – according to other records 4,000 men – of the Prince-Bishop of Münster passed through Haselünne and invaded the Swedish Amt of Wildeshausen. They continued their advance to the River Weser unimpeded. On 25 September at Bremen, Münster's artillery fired across the Weser.

A Brandenburg force of 1,600 infantry and 700 cavalry under Major General Freiherr von Spaen, coming from Westphalian territory, also arrived in Bremen at the end of September. The Danes participated with 2,500 men under the orders of Count Gustavus Adolphus of Baudissin.

The Münster troops under Prince-Bishop von Galen marched from neutral Bremen to the fortress of Langwedel on the Weser, capturing it on 27 and 28 September. With that, the way into the state of the former Prince-Bishopric of Verden was open. Verden upon Aller itself fell into Allied hands on 27 September. Münster forces suddenly invaded the town and established themselves at one of the town gates.

After Verden the town of Rotenburg was conquered, falling after some resistance. From there the marching column pressed on immediately towards Ottersberg, which was taken on 3 October 1675 by the now seasoned troops of the Prince-Bishop of Münster. The roughly 140 man Swedish garrison were taken prisoner. The Allied army then marched in a northeasterly direction with Buxtehude as their objective, reaching it on 12 October.

Buxtehude was well fortified, had plenty of food and munitions and, according to the Theatrum Europaeum, a garrison of nearly 400 men. A siege appeared inevitable. After occupying an important eminence in front of the town that same day, the Allies drew up all their artillery of 14 mortars and 37 cannon into battery positions. Shelling commenced on the morning of 13 October, setting fire to over 60 houses. On 14 October a total of 100 mortar bombs and 60 artillery shells were fired into the town from howitzers and mortars, again wreaking much damage, but without causing a single fatality. On 15 October, fire was lifted in order for the trenches necessary for an assault on the town to be prepared and in order to launch an all-out attack.

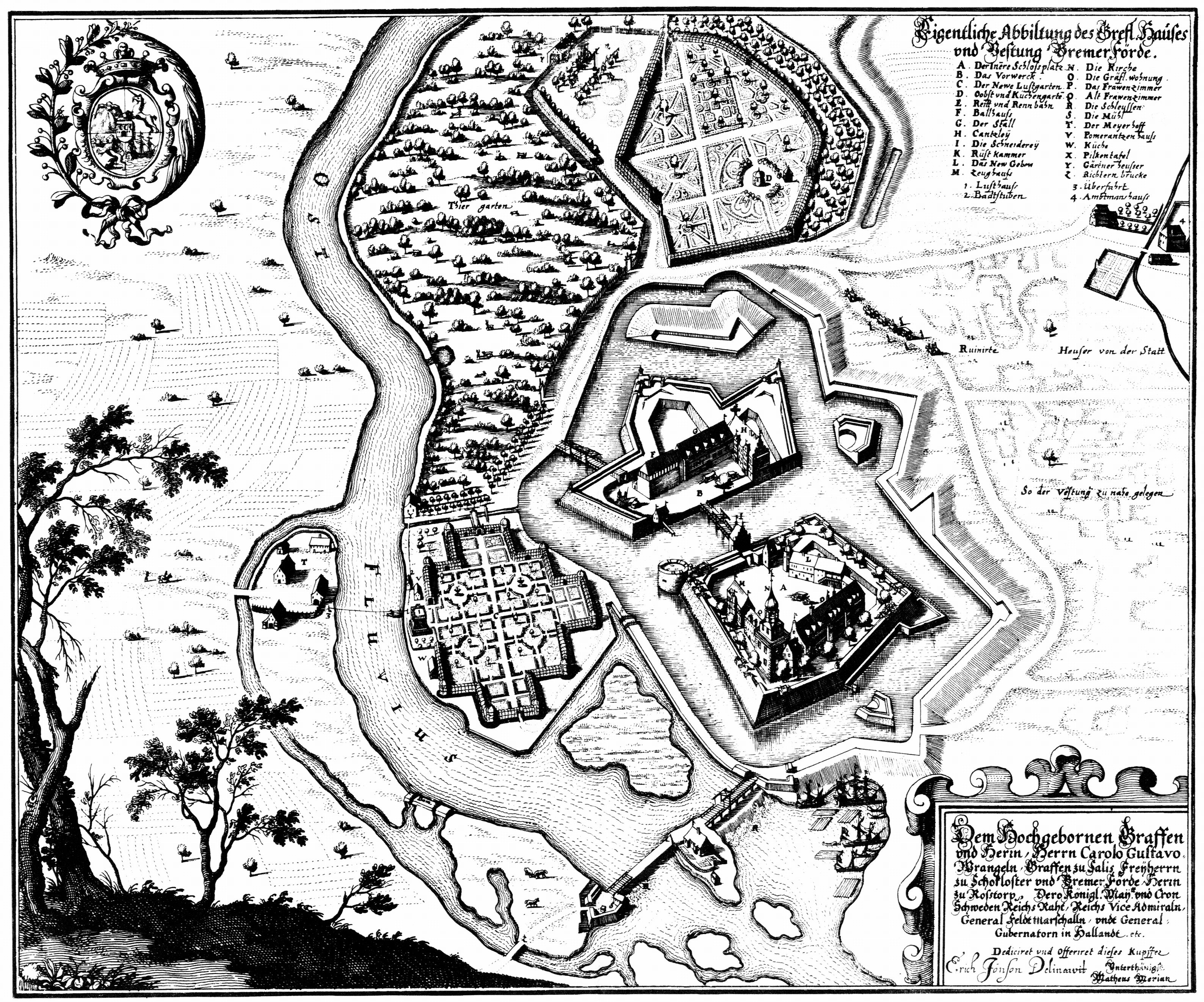
View of Bremervörde in 1653 1653 copperplate by Matthäus Merian

Because the shelling had already resulted in heavy damage, the Buxtehude commandant, Hamelton, was forced to surrender the town having been implored by its citizens and his German mercenaries who had learned of the pronouncement of the Imperial Ban on Sweden. The garrison was permitted to withdraw to Stade taking its belongings and side arms. On 16 October the Allies entered the town, 24 cannon and their munitions falling into their hands as a result.

After the fall of Buxtehude several Allied regiments pushed forward towards Bremervörde. On 25 October the siege of Bremervörde Fortress began. After three days of heavy shelling the mercenaries, who were mainly German, refused to render military service for the garrison. The Allies sent a trumpeter into the town as a parlimentaire. He threatened the garrison that all German combatants would be executed when the fortress was captured. The threat was based on the fact that they had used their weapons in the service of an outlaw against the Holy Roman Empire. In view of the situation, the Swedish commander had no choice but to surrender the place. The Swedish officers and men were given free passage with all their possessions and weapons, whilst most of the Germans transferred to the Allied side. As the result of a previous agreement amongst the Allies, the town had been promised to the Lüneburg troops who entered Buxtehude with 500 men. At this time on the fortresses of Carlsburg and Stade remained in Swedish hands.

=== Brandenburg and Danish landing operations ===
The Swedish Empire around 1660 with its 2 North German possessions

In parallel with the advance of Münster, Brandenburg and Danish troops, there were two unsuccessful landing attempts by Danish and Brandenburg forces, that were repulsed by the Swedes with heavy losses. The first landing operation, at the end of September, was carried out near Carlshagen by a Brandenburg formation under Admiral Simon de Bolfey, in order to conquer the strategically important Carlsburg Fortress on the Weser. This Swedish fortress had been first constructed in 1672 with the task of controlling the mouth of the Weser. Approaching from the River Elbe, a Brandenburg squadron of seven ships appeared, with a landing force of 534 men; together with the ships' complements, the whole force comprised about 800–900 men.

On 28 September, the troops were landed near Lehe, north of Carlsburg. Because the Swedish commander of Carlsburg, which was relatively strongly defended by about 800 soldiers, refused to surrender, the Brandenburg admiral, de Bolfey, had his troops erect earthworks in front of the town and, on 30 September, opened fire with several salvoes from his ships' guns. However, on the same day the landing force pulled back from its positions in front of the fortress, in the course of which 30 Brandenburg soldiers switched sides to join the Swedes. Encouraged by the statements of these deserters, on 1 October the Swedes launched an attack with 200 men, but had to withdraw with losses after a brief fight.

In order to relieve Carlsburg Fortress, 13 squadrons of cavalry were dispatched there from Stade under the command of Lieutenant Colonel Sidon. The Brandenburgers, who were now clearly outnumbered, were informed by scouts of the approaching force. They lifted the siege and embarked on the ships again on 2 October. Due to unfavourable winds, the ships, now loaded with the infantry, found themselves close to the shore as the Swedish reinforcements arrived. Consequently, they were attacked by the Swedes and, after resisting a short time, had to capitulate to superior forces. Total losses suffered by the Brandenburg force during this operation came to 314 men, the majority taken prisoner.

Roughly at the same time, a Danish flotilla landed six companies of infantry under Lieutenant Colonel Harwich on the territory of Land Wursten. But after their successful defence of Carlsburg, the Swedish units under Sidon attacked these Danish mercenaries. After several battles on 4 October, the Swedes succeeded in defeating the Danes and taking 400 of them prisoner. Of these, 200 were then taken into Swedish service and ordered to reinforce the garrison at Carlsburg. The other prisoners were held (untergesteckt) in Stade. The main body of the Swedish troops returned to Stade on 7 October. The naval blockade of Carlsburg was lifted and the seven Brandenburg ships repaired instead to the River Elbe in order to cut off the seaward supply route to the town of Stade. By contrast, Carlsburg was besieged again in late October, despite the Swedes previous successful defence of the town.

=== Allied change of command ===
In October about 3,000 men of the Principality of Lüneburg under the command of Duke George William of Brunswick-Lüneburg arrived in the theatre of war from the Rhineland. As the appointed circle colonel of the Lower Saxon Circle, the duke took overall command of the now 12,000 strong Allied army.

In the headquarters of Prince-Bishop von Galen in Rotenburg a secret treaty was signed on 14 October, wherein the Prince-Bishop, Duke George William and Duke Rudolph Augustus of Brunswick-Wolfenbüttel agreed to provide mutual support to one another in the ensuing campaign. Furthermore, a provisional division of the conquests was negotiated that excluded Denmark and Brandenburg.

In the aftermath of this campaign there was considerable disagreement and distrust, as the Protestant federated princes did not want to give the Roman Catholic Prince-Bishop von Galen too much influence in a Protestant Imperial Circle.

=== Attacks on Stade, the Siege of Carlsburg, Swedish raids ===
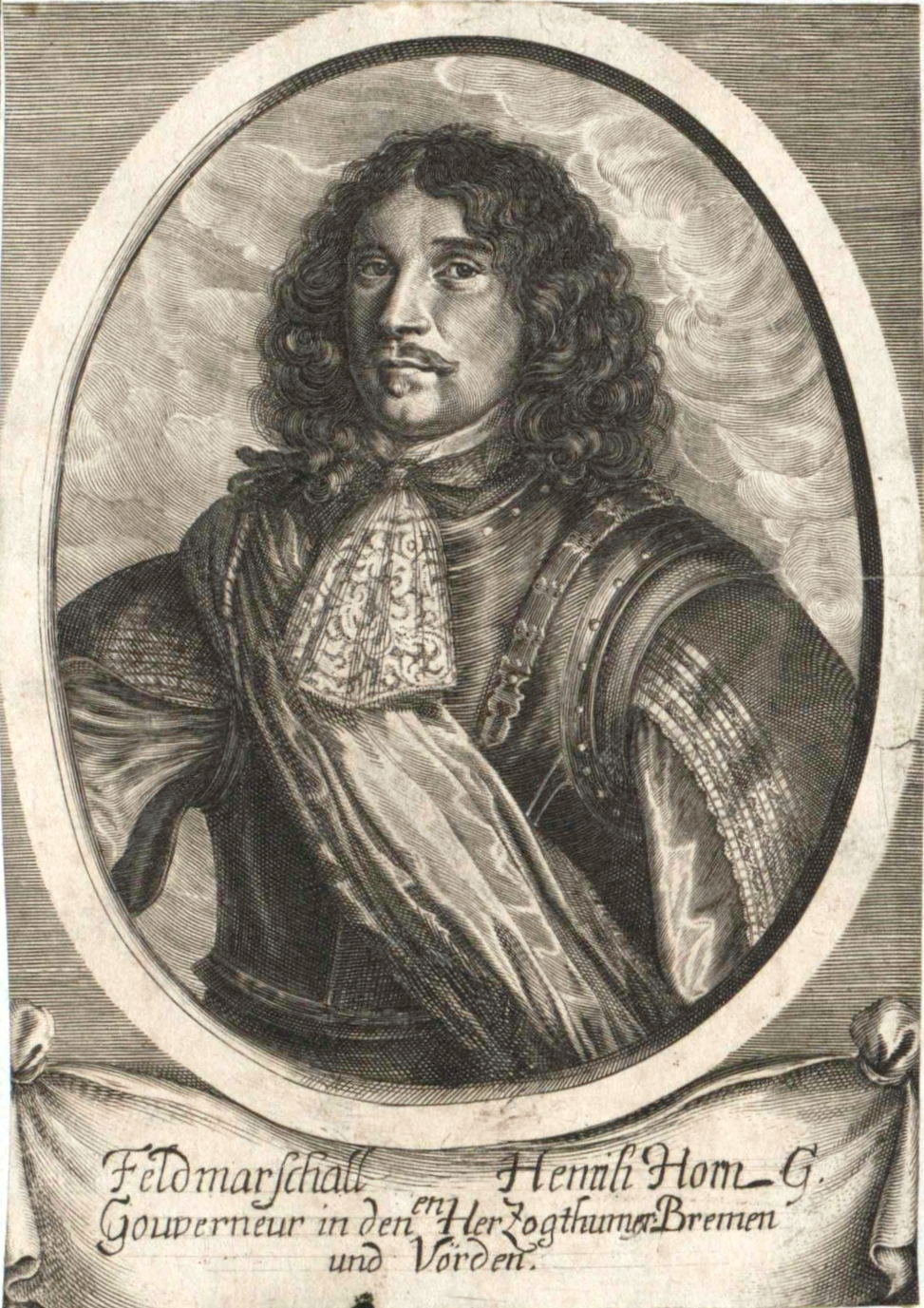
The Swedish statthalter of Bremen-Verden, Field Marshal Henrik Horn (1618–1693) from: Theatrum Europaeum, Vol. 11, 1682

On 4 November the Allies advanced on Stade, the HQ of the Swedish regional government of Bremen-Verden. The Stade garrison under Field Marshal Henrik Horn, the Swedish governor general of the Duchy, had 5,624 soldiers and 600 militia at his disposal.

In the face of the threat, Horn had the town thoroughly prepared for defence. To prevent the desertion of German mercenaries in Stade upon arrival of the Allies, the marshal used material incentives and propaganda. Since Sweden had been declared an enemy of the Empire and Emperor Leopold I, in declaring the Mandata Avocatoria, had ordered that all subjects of the Holy Roman Empire had to renounce Swedish service, German mercenaries were deserting the Swedish forces in droves. So, at the beginning of November, Horn had the former Buxtehude commander, Hamelton, publicly executed for surrendering the fortress in Stade prematurely. All German mercenaries in Stade had to publicly reswear their oath of allegiance to the Swedish crown. By adopting this brutal approach, Field Marshal Horn was able to discipline his garrison force for the time being and ensure its serious defence.

Repeated attacks on the fortress of Stade on 6 and 7 November 1675 were unsuccessful, and the Allies could not agree on continuing the siege of the town because of its stubborn resistance and the onset of winter. Finally, on 9 November, the Allies withdrew their troops into winter quarters. The hitherto captured forts remained under Allied occupation, in order to maintain the blockade of Stade. The Brandenburg troops left the theatre of war heading for the Duchy of Cleves and Principality of Minden.

The Swedes took advantage of the lull around their garrisoned fortresses to temporarily wrest back the initiative. They repeatedly carried out raids and sent out foraging parties. Individual companies went upriver to Buxtehude, Cranz and Altona, and downriver to Bielenberg and Kollmar, burning and pillaging. Their exploits included the destruction or capture of several Danish and Dutch ships on the Elbe.

In early January, Colonel Sydau, with about 400 dragoons and 400 infantrymen, led another Swedish expedition to Freiburg/Elbe in Kehdingen against about 500 entrenched Münster soldiers under Lieutenant Colonel Lamsdorff. Following the failure of a frontal assault by the Swedes, Sydau ordered his dragoons to circumvent the position and attack the rear of the Danish position. After the dragoons had taken their assault position in the village as per their orders, a Swedish attack was launched on the earthworks from all sides. The Münster troops sustained heavy losses, gave up the position and fled. Pursued by Swedish cavalry, 260 were captured. By contrast, the Swedes lost just 50 men in the Battle of Freiburg on the Elbe. Among the prisoners, were 15 mercenaries who had originally joined up for Swedish service, but had changed sides after the fall of Bremervörde. They were made an example of: one of the deserters was quartered in Stade as a deterrent, five were hanged and nine were branded.

This successful phase for the Swedes came to an end when Carlsburg, which had been besieged since the end of October, capitulated. A lack of ammunition, food and soldiers resulted in the surrender of the fortress on 22 January by its commander, the Frenchman, Colonel Jean Mell, to the united Münster, Danish and Lüneburg siege troops. The Swedish garrison, still about 380 strong (of which 200 were unfit to fight), were given free passage. At the surrender of the fortress 80 cannon fell into the hands of the Allies. In accordance with the treaty a mixed Münster and Lüneburg garrison took over.

== Allied disagreements ==
Because the Prince-Bishopric of Münster and the Duchy of Lüneburg had agreed in advance to exclude Denmark and Brandenburg from the future division of Bremen-Verden, there were serious arguments amongst the Allies, which affected and endangered the continuation of hostilities against Sweden. For example, the Prince-Bishopric of Münster demanded the former Prince-Bishopric of Verden (later Verden duchy), the Ämter ("districts") of Wildeshausen, Burg, Bremervörde, Ottersberg and Thedinghausen The rest was to be annexed by Lüneburg-Celle. Denmark and Brandenburg, on the other hand, argued for an equal distribution of Allied conquests. Denmark demanded Carlsburg and Stade, and thus the control of the Weser and Elbe estuaries, in order to be able exchange them later in return for the deployment of auxiliary troops from Münster and Lüneburg for the Pomeranian War (Swedish-Brandenburg War).

This dispute involving conflicting territorial claims escalated to such an extent that it threatened to come to open war between the Allies. The General States endeavoured to mediate between the parties to this situation, so as not to jeopardize the war against France. They therefore sent ambassadors, initially van der Tocht and, later, Amerongen, to Bremen for the negotiations. The statthalter ("governor") of the Netherlands, William III of Orange, proposed that all fortresses in Bremen-Verden should be slighted, to negotiate the final apportionment of territory at the peace congress in Nijmegen and to transfer provisional administration of both duchies to Lüneburg-Celle and Münster. Brandenburg and Denmark were expressly entitled to retain their rights to territorial interests in Bremen-Verden if, contrary to expectations, they did not achieve "compensation" in Swedish Pomerania and Scania. Although Brandenburg's envoy wanted to reach a provisional breakdown of the areas in question in the Hague, on 28 March he gave his approval to the treaty because he saw no other way to achieve an end to the dispute between the Allies, something which was essential for the continuation of the campaign.

Although the Elector of Brandenburg did not ratify the decision of his envoy, he dropped his objections to the deployment of Lüneburg auxiliaries to Bremen-Verden in the light of the favourable progress being made in the war against Sweden in Swedish Pomerania.

Nevertheless, the Elector secured Denmark's support in a secret agreement in early 1677 that Brandenburg should get "at least one fifth of territory to be divided in Bremen-Verden."

== Siege of Stade, 1676 ==
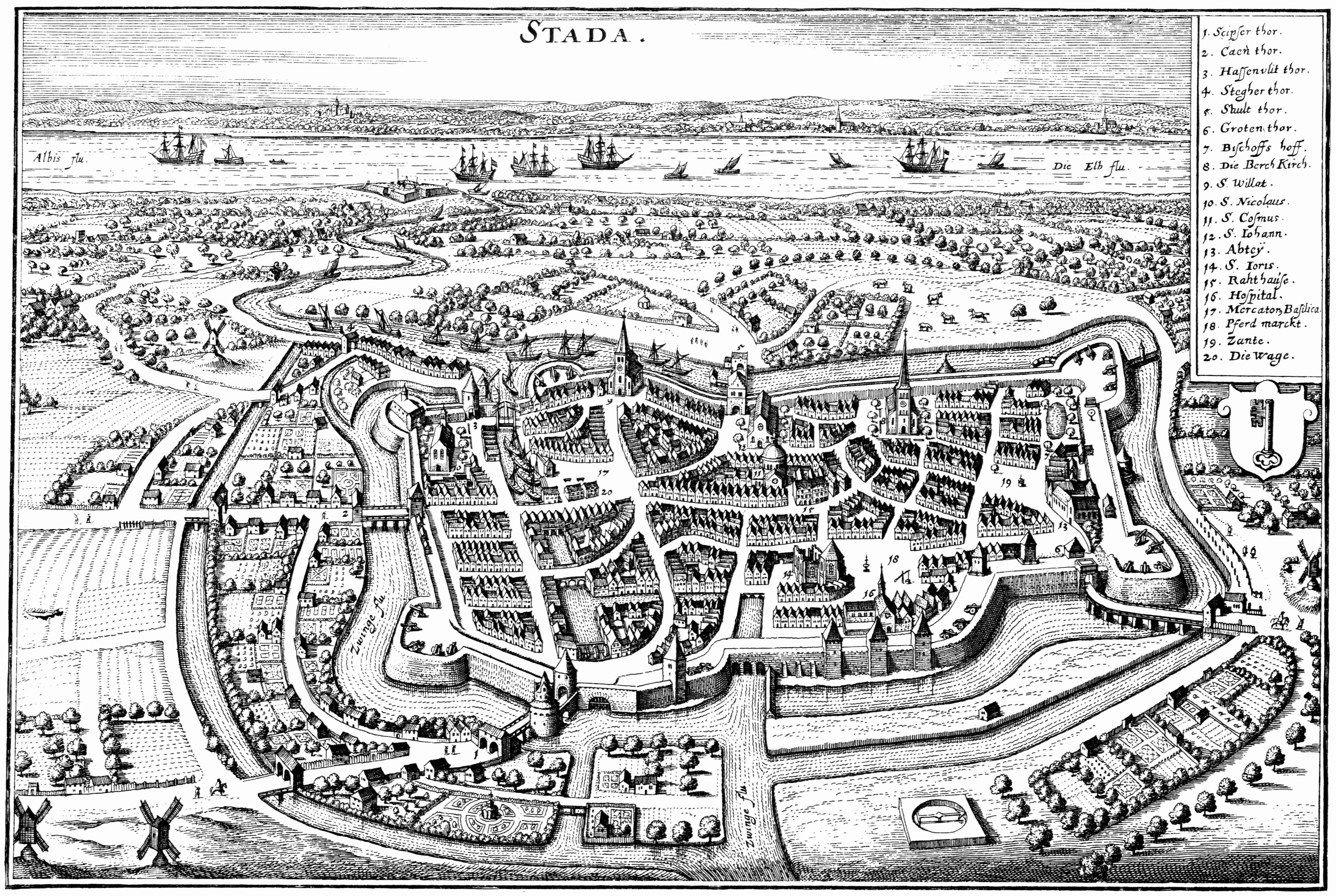
Stade around 1640 Copperplate by Matthäus Merian

The ongoing dispute over the distribution of Bremen-Verden amongst the allies delayed the onset of the siege of Stade until spring 1676. The Allies agreed the terms on 28 April and 8 May in Bremervörde. This envisaged the attack on the last Swedish possession to be carried out with 16,000 infantry and 4,000 cavalry. The conquered fortress was to be filled equally by troops from Denmark, Brandenburg, Lüneburg-Celle and Munster. In early April the Lüneburg commander, Lieutenant General Chauvet, implemented measures to blockade the town. As a consequence, there were almost daily skirmishes and Swedish raids with varying degrees of success. At the same time, the besiegers began to build earthworks.

Stade had access to the sea by virtue of its location at the mouth of the Schwinge, a tributary of the Elbe. Part of the Swedish fortifications also included a fieldwork that guarded the mouth of the Schwinge in Stadersand. Under its protection, several Swedish ships were able to reach the town, providing much needed supplies during the course of the siege. So to prevent access to Stade from the sea and thus tighten the stranglehold of the siege, the Allies decided to seize the Schwinge fieldwork. To this end, they called for artillery from Glückstadt and also brought in two 18-gun Lüneburg ships into the mouth of the Schwinge. All Swedish attempts to disrupt the preparations were repulsed. The Allies drew closer and closer to the hill and established a battery that opened a continual fire on the Swedish position. On 23 April the Swedes carried out a new raid with 300 horsemen, but were again driven back after initial success, with a loss of 46 men, according to contemporary sources. On 4 July, the Allies completed their earthworks and shelled the Schwinge position so heavily that its roughly 100-man-unit capitulated.

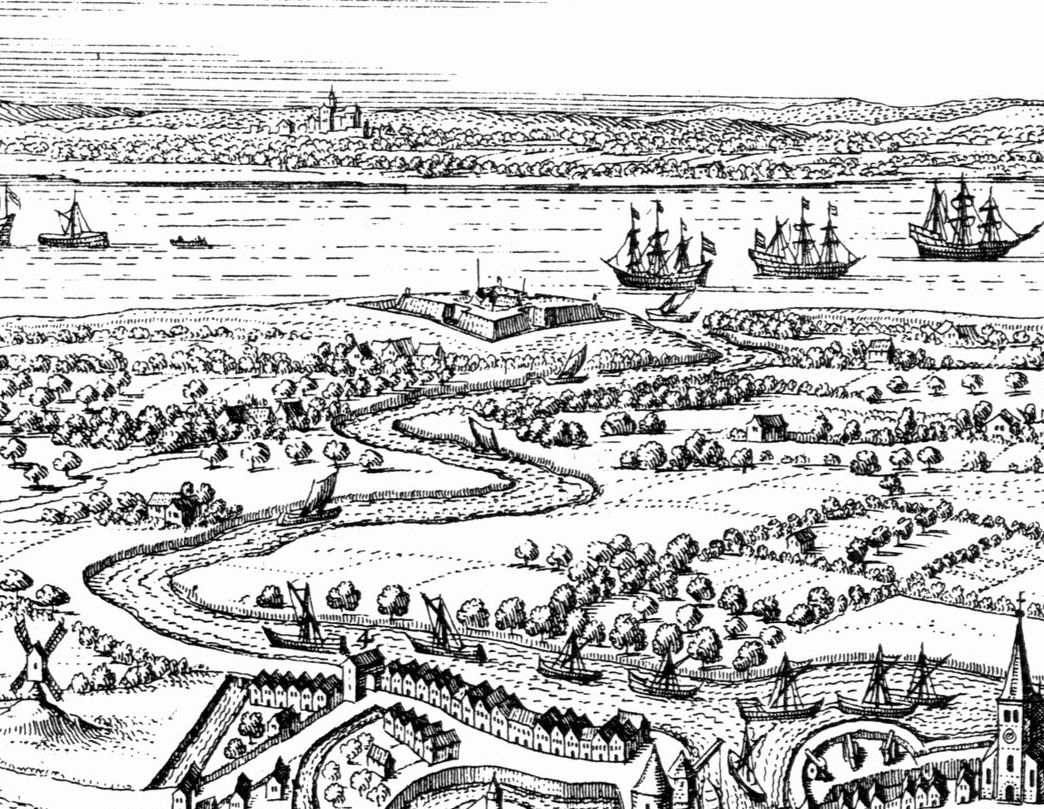
Drawing of the Schwinge fieldwork near Stade

With the loss of the Schwinge fieldwork, the resupply of Stade from the sea was no longer possible. When three Swedish warships, held up by unfavourable winds, and six other transport ships loaded with supplies, reached the mouth of the Schwinge, they were shelled by Allied batteries stationed on the banks of the Schwinge estuary. The Swedish fleet had to withdraw from Stade and, after a few raids into the area around the Elbe, they left.

Cut off from all resupply, the situation in the fortress of Stade deteriorated considerably. An outbreak of shigellosis reduced the strength of the garrison to around 3,000 soldiers. With the deterioration in the material situation, moral amongst the besieged fell. Twice there were mutinies amongst the Swedish soldiers which could only be put down with the use of repressive measures. The desertion of German mercenaries now grew to such an extent that active defence with patrols and raids was no longer possible.

In June, the earthworks on the Allied side were so far advanced that they reached the town moats. However, the town was not shelled, because they intended to starve its citizens and not storm it in order to protect their own forces. Countermeasures by the Swedish garrison consisted of flooding the surrounding area by opening the locks on the river. However, their besiegers succeeded in draining the water through two channels to the Elbe.

As the supply situation in the town became ever more critical, the Stade citizens and the garrison's governor general, Horn, were forced to negotiate with their besiegers. The negotiations began on 13/23 July. However, they were delayed at the behest of population who, despite the tougher conditions preferred to be garrisoned by Protestant Lüneburg troops rather than Catholic Munster forces. As a result of the surrender negotiations, the town was to be occupied by nine Lüneburg companies under General Chauvet. The German mercenaries had to terminate their Swedish service. In the early morning of 13 August 1676, Field Marshal Horn, with 10 cannon and 800 Swedish soldiers, pulled out. The 1,400 German mercenaries were either detained (untergesteckt) or released. The last Swedish bastion in Bremen-Verden was now in Allied hands.

== Aftermath ==
Following the conquest of Stade, 3,000 Lüneburg troops under the command of Major General von Ende were sent to Swedish Pomerania to support the local Brandenburg troops. The rest went at the end of September, with some Münster troops, to fight the French at Wetzlar on the River Lahn.

During the occupation of Stade, Prince-Bishop von Galen led a re-Catholicization of the area he controlled, and Catholic services were reintroduced in many places. At the end of the war, Bremen-Verden remained in Allied possession. Denmark left 3,000 men as garrison troops in the Duchy of Bremen.

The plans for the division of Bremen-Verden were dashed when Lüneburg-Celle concluded a peace treaty in Celle on 28 January 1679. Lüneburg undertook to leave all its occupied territories after the conclusion of the general peace treaty. After French troops had invaded Westphalia, the new Prince-Bishop of Münster, Ferdinand of Fürstenberg returned all his conquests to Sweden in the Peace of Nijmegen on 29 March 1679. The Prince-Bishopric of Münster was only allowed to keep the Amt of Wildeshausen as a pledge until the payment of a war indemnity of 100,000 Reichstalers by Sweden. This payment was not made until 1699. France promised the Bishop of Munster that they would work for the preservation of the newly created Catholic institutions in the Duchy of Bremen and Principality of Verden.

Verden, Langwedel and Rotenburg were cleared of Münster troops on 14 January 1680, Bremervörde followed on 15 January and Ottersberg and Carlsburg on 17 January. The departure of Lüneburg soldiers from Stade was delayed until 10 March 1680.

== See also ==
- Wars and battles involving Prussia

== Literature ==
- Henning Eichberg: Festung, Zentralmacht und Soziogeometrie – Kriegsingenieurswesen des 17. Jahrhunderts in den Herzogtümern Bremen und Verden. Böhlau Verlag, Cologne, 1989, ISBN 3-412-01988-7
- Curt Jany: Geschichte der preußischen Armee- vom 15. Jahrhundert bis 1914. Biblio Verlag, Vol. 1, Osnabruck, 1967, pp. 229–231
- Studienrat Geppert: Die Geschichte des Emslandes im Rahmen der allgemeinen deutschen Geschichte. Osnabrück III. Teil, Seiten 6–21 in: Emslandbuch. Ein Heimatbuch für die Kreise Meppen, Aschendorf, Hümmling. 1928, self-published by the counties of Meppen, Aschendorf, Hümmling.
- Maren Lorenz: Das Rad der Gewalt. Militär und Zivilbevölkerung in Norddeutschland nach dem Dreißigjährigen Krieg (1650–1700). Böhlau: Cologne, 2007.
- Matthias Nistal: Oldenburg und die Reichsexekution gegen Schweden. Oldenburger Jahrbuch 104, 2004, pp. 65–99
- Matthias Nistal: Die Reichsexekution gegen Schweden in Bremen-Verden, in Heinz-Joachim Schulze (ed.) Landschaft und regionale Identität, Stade, 1989
- von Eichart:Geschichte der königlich hannoverschen Armee. First volume, Hanover, 1866, pp. 396–398
- Anon: Theatrum Europaeum. Vol. 11 (1682, appeared 1707), pp. 721–732, 864–865
- Ersch/Gruber: Allgemeine Encyclopädie der Wissenschaften und Künste. Section 1, Part 52 (G – Gallatin), Leipzig, 1851, pp. 334–335
