= Carlsburg, Weser =

Coordinates: 53.54°N 8.58333°E

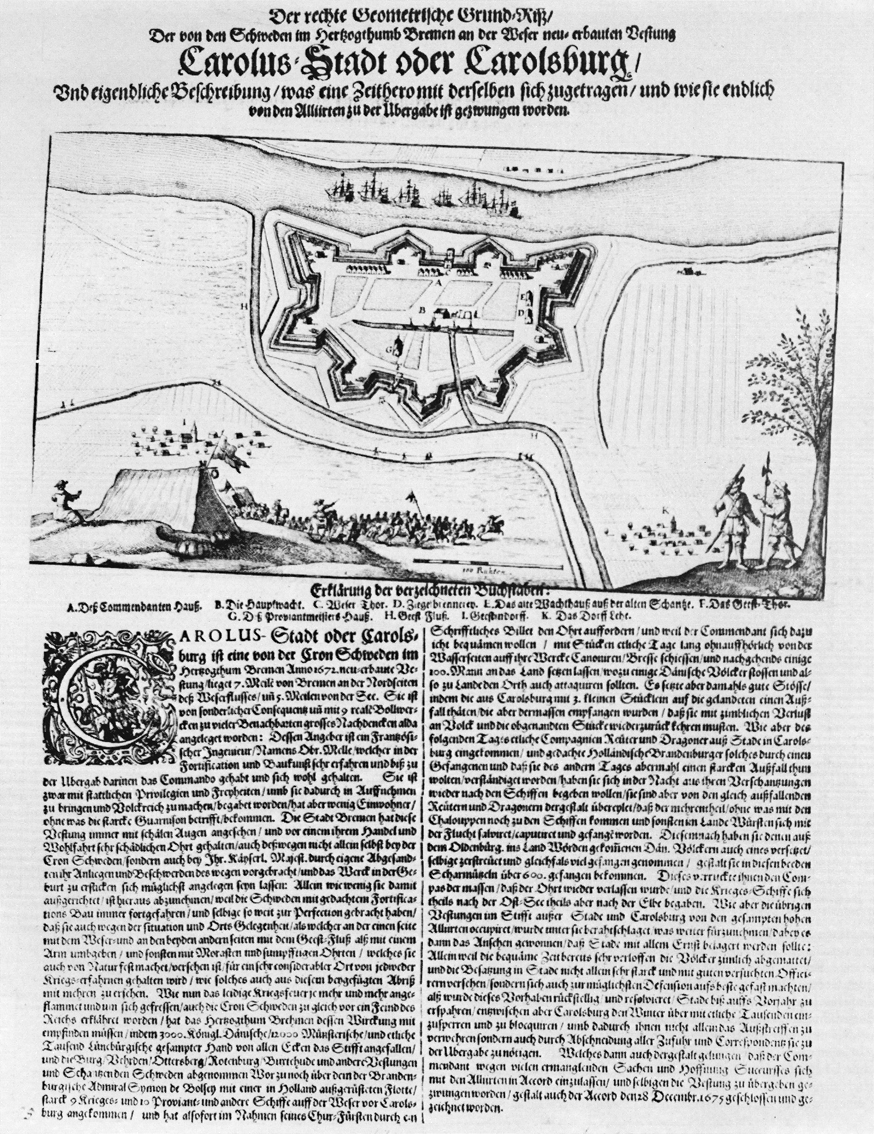
Leaflet showing Carlsburg in 1676

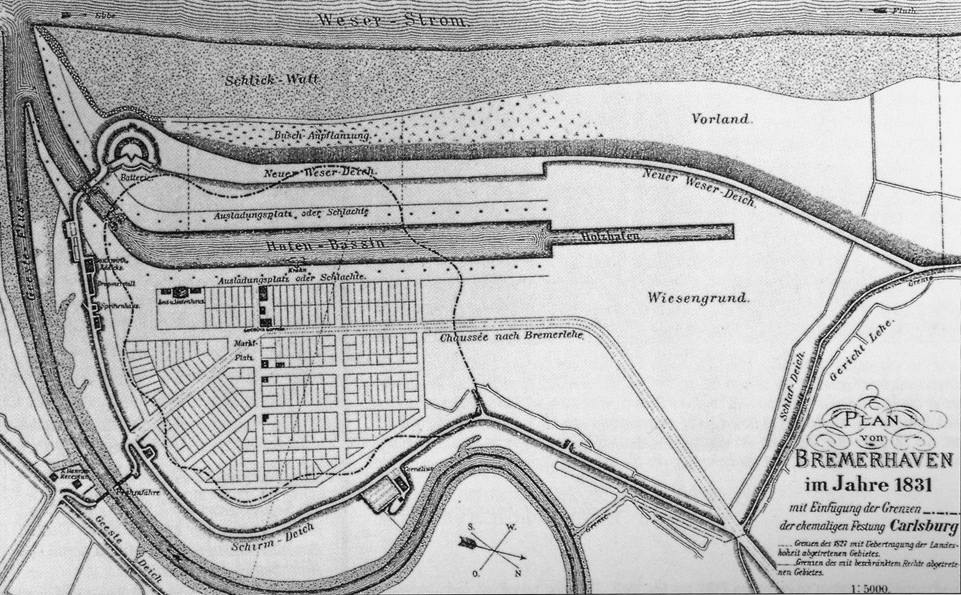
Bremerhaven in 1831, former Carlsburg outlined with dotted lines

Carlsburg (also Carolus-Stadt or Carolsburg) was a 17th-century fortified town in Swedish Bremen-Verden at the confluence of the Weser and Geeste rivers, at the site of modern Bremerhaven, Germany. Planned to compete with Bremen, the settlement did not prosper.

After the Thirty Years' War, the Swedish Empire gained the Lower Saxon Prince-Archbishopric of Bremen as a Swedish dominion. The status of the city of Bremen however was uncertain, and Sweden was unable to gain control of the town in two subsequent wars, 1654 and 1666. As Bremen itself was out of reach, a new town was built nearby, named Carlsburg after the Swedish king Charles XI.

The town was planned by Stockholm architect Nicodemus Tessin the Elder. Tessin planned the public buildings and streets. He designated 300 to 456 building grounds for houses. Constructions began on 11 June 1672.

== Siege of Carlsburg ==
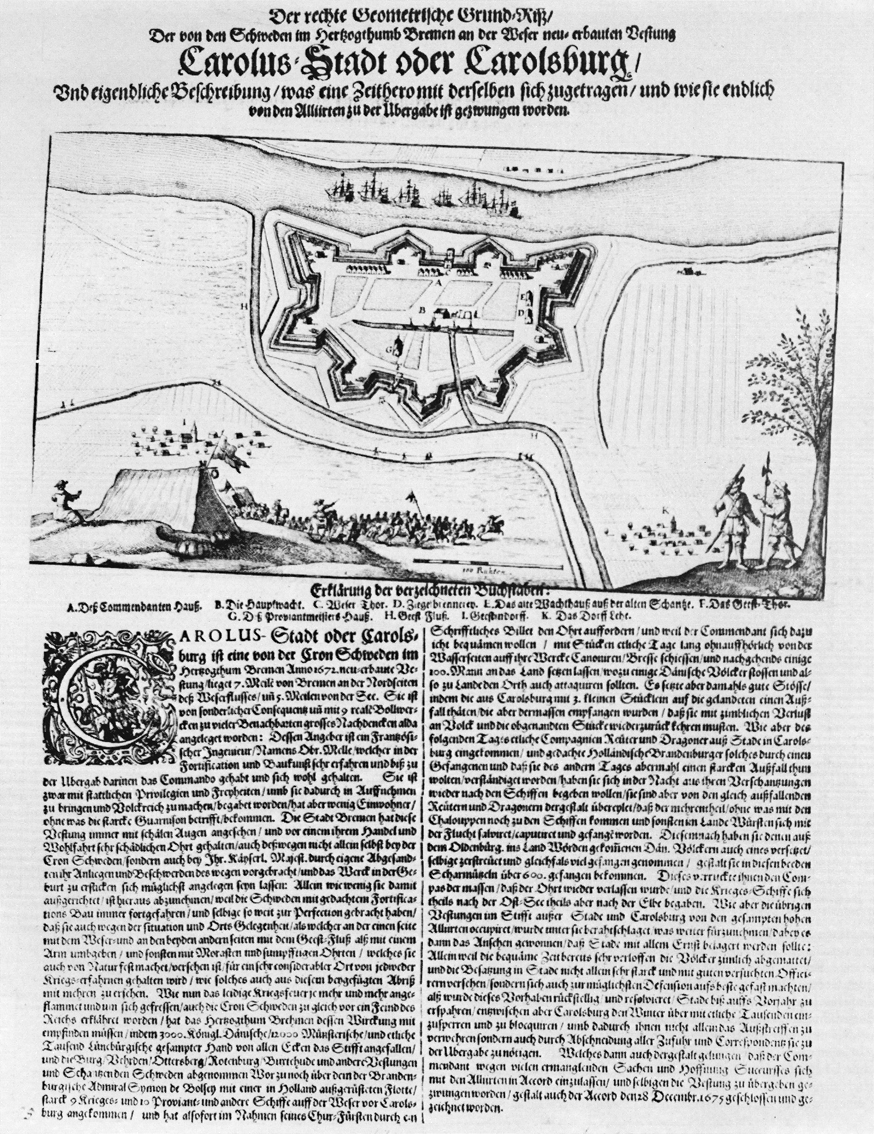
Leaflet of the Siege of Carlsburg in 1675/1676

Before the construction and settlement plans for Carlsburg could be realised, building work had to be interrupted in 1675, when an alliance of Brandenburg-Prussia, the Principality of Lüneburg, the Prince-Bishopric of Münster and Denmark attacked Swedish possessions in North Germany during the Bremen-Verden Campaign. Little is known about the exact state of the extent of the town and its harbor at this point in time. It is probably that there were only a few buildings apart from the quarters for the Swedish garrison, the commandant's house, the house for the commissary (Proviantmeister) and a brickworks. Even the number of civilians in the town was still very low. The town fortifications were sufficiently far advanced that the Swedish contingent of 600 to 800 men and 72 cannon was able to successfully fight off the first blockade of the town by Brandenburg ships and Danish soldiers.

== Later history ==
When Carlsburg was besieged for a second time in late October 1675, its weakened garrison, decimated by illness and a lack of food, quickly surrendered in January 1676 to Münster and Lüneburg troops. After the surrender the fortress was partially demolished, other damage to its structure were caused by flooding.

In 1675/76, during the Scanian War, the newly created navy of Brandenburg-Prussia launched its first attack on a landside fortification on Carlsburg. The attack however was not successful.

Sweden lost the site in the course of the Great Northern War in 1712. When Bremerhaven was founded in 1827, some of the old Carlsburg walls were levelled.

== Sources ==
- Bisping, Mascha (2003). "Stadtplanung als politische Interpretation eines geographischen Raumes: Carlsburg und Bremerhaven". In Jöchner, Cornelia (ed.). Politische Räume: Stadt und Land in der Frühneuzeit (in German). Berlin: Akademie Verlag. pp. 45–66. ISBN 3-05-003774-1.
- Eichberg, Henning (1976). Militär und Technik. Schwedenfestungen des 17. Jahrhunderts in den Herzogtümern Bremen und Verden. Düsseldorf: Schwann (in German).
- Elmshäuser, Konrad (2007). Geschichte Bremens. Beck'sche Reihe (in German). Vol. 2605. Munich: Beck. ISBN 978-3-406-55533-6.
- Gosch, Frank (2003). Festungsbau an Nordsee und Ostsee: die Geschichte der deutschen Küstenbefestigungen bis 1918 (in German). Hamburg: Mittler. ISBN 3-8132-0743-9.
