= Treaty of Celle =

1679 treaty

The Treaty of Celle was signed on 5 February 1679 (NS) / January 26, 1679 (OS) in Celle. Sweden acceded to the Treaty of Nijmegen. In exchange for ceding control of Thedinghausen and Dörverden, its sovereignty over Bremen-Verden was confirmed.
