= Swedish conflicts with the Teutonic Order (1472–1488) =

Wars between the Teutonic Order and Sweden

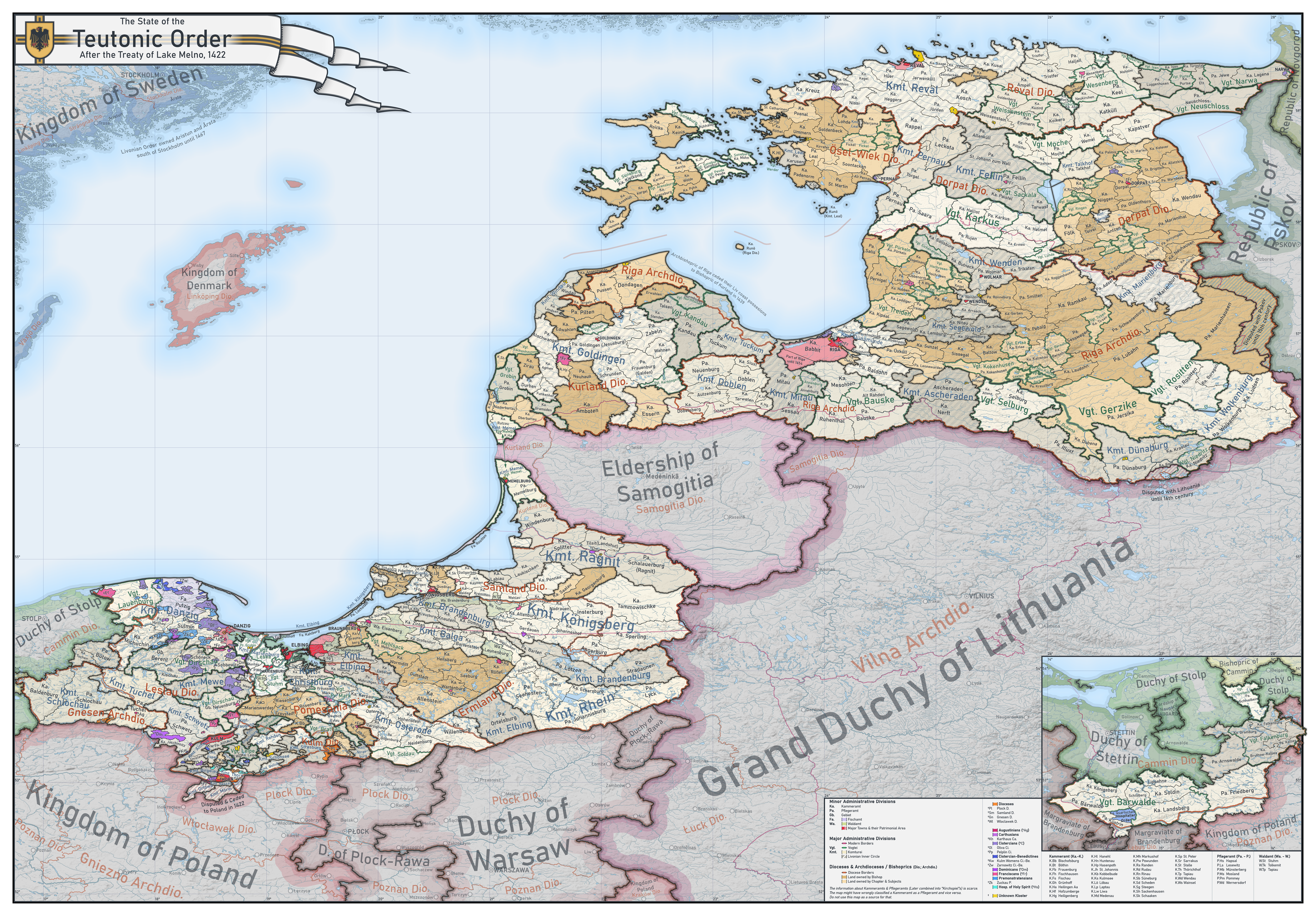
- Territories of the Teutonic and Livonian orders (1422)
Date	1472–1488 (Note: First war: 1472–1475/77 Second war: 1478 Third war: 1485–1488)
Location	Livonia, Estonia
Result	Inconclusive
Territorial changes	Status quo ante bellum

Belligerents
(History of Sweden (800–1521)) Sweden; Tott dynasty; Riga; Livonian rebels	Teutonic Order; Livonian Order

Commanders and leaders
(History of Sweden (800–1521)) Sten Sture the Elder (History of Sweden (800–1521)) Erik Axelsson Tott (History of Sweden (800–1521)) Lars Axelsson Tott (History of Sweden (800–1521)) Erik Ragvaldsson (History of Sweden (800–1521)) Erik Nilsson Gyllenstierna	Unknown

Strength
First war Unknown Second war 200 men 5 ships Third war Large	Unknown

Casualties and losses
Light	Light

The Swedish conflicts with the Teutonic Order were a series of wars fought between Sweden and the Teutonic Order as well as its Livonian branch, from 1472 to 1488. It consisted of three wars in total, the first from 1472 to 1475, the second in 1478, and the last from 1485 to 1488. Sweden ultimately maintained its hold over Riga, although the city eventually fell after Swedish troops had left.

== Background ==
Shortly after the peace signed with Denmark in 1472, Sweden became involved in the Teutonic Order's inner fighting. The Order was in a state of decline, based on a religious war, it was unsuitable for a normal and peaceful governance of the land. As soon as the purpose of its creation, to fight against Paganism was gone, it quickly began suffering from internal division.

== Conflicts ==
=== First war (1473–1475/77) ===
Since the 1450s, the leading representatives of the Tott dynasty had controlled most of Finland, with Erik Axelsson Tott governing eastern Finland including Viborg and Tavastehus, while Lars Axelsson Tott ruled over Raseborg. These two maintained good and frequent contact with their brother, Ivar Axelsson Tott, who controlled Gotland.

The Tott dynasty quickly became involved in the political dissidence around the Teutonic Order. The origin of the conflict was that in 1470, a certain Johan von Wolthausen had been appointed the Master of Livonia, but was quickly deposed after just one year, being imprisoned at Wenden Castle and replaced by Bernhard von der Borch. It was clear from the subsequent events that Bernhard was an "ambitious and unscrupulous man" and not fit for the role. Rebels under the deposed Masters' brother, Ernst, would start a rebellion, finding many supporters, especially in Estonia along with the Bishop of Dorpat. The rebels would then turn to Sweden or the Tott dynasty for help. Ernst letter went to the Totts in Finland, who soon wrote a letter on the 17 September 1472 to the Grand Master of the Teutonic Order, demanding the reinstatement of Johan von Wolthausen, threatening that they would support his brother if their demand wasn't fulfilled. However, despite this, the letter didn't lead to any action, as the Grand Master could do little in the matter. leading the Totts to declare war on the Teutonic Order in 1473.

Ernst would hold out in Estonia, with Swedish garrisons quickly being placed in Reval's fortress from 1474 to 1475, and another in Narva in 1475, the involvement by the Swedish government is also evident from a letter written on September 27, 1474, where the Council of the Realm urged the Grand Master to send his representatives to Stockholm the following Pentecost in order to negotiate peace. However, no such meeting took place, and the conflict escalated further when the Swedish government offered support to the Archbishop of Riga on July 2, 1475, specifically against Bernhard von der Boch.

This offer was accepted, as the Archbishop Sylvester had recently obtained a bull from Rome giving him lordship over Riga and made the Bishop of Dorpat as executor, but he lacked the resources to carry it out. He responded with a detailed account of the Livonian Order's encroachment on the rights of the archbishop, along with two envoys to resolve the matter. However, no formal treaty was seemingly concluded, and the imprisoned Johan would die in 1476, removing one of the reasons for the war. Nevertheless, Sylvester also seemingly looked for support from King Christian of Denmark, and when he had received some Swedish envoys in Rotneby after a meeting in Kalmar, it was decided that the Danish councillor Werner Parsberger, along with the pastor Sven Pettersson, would travel to Livonia as mediators.

The two arrived in the land assembly at Wolmar on 21 February, 1477, with written calls for reconciliation. Here, a ten-year long truce would be concluded between the Archbishop and Riga, along with his knights and the leaders of the Order. Sylvester would then thank the Swedish council.

However, Sylvester also requested promises of help and protection in the future, as he had not been present at the meeting itself and arrived at the last moment with fresh demands, making it clear that he was not intending to accept the treaty. Meanwhile, the Swedish government also reached an agreement with the Livonian Order, which, on July 2, received assurances that no retaliation would be taken for the capture of a certain Erik Ragvaldsson, who was likely the commander of a Swedish support troop.

=== Second war (1478) ===
After the Totts war with the Teutonic Order, the conflict between the latter and the Archbishop of Riga, the "scheming" Sylvester, flared up again. Responding to this, the Swedish council allied with the Archbishop and sent five ships with 200 men onboard towards Salis in the Gulf of Riga, with other ships being said to have lost in accidents.

Sylvester, not feeling powerful enough to openly confront the Order, wrote to the Land Master, claiming that the Swedish troops had arrived without his knowledge and offered him a portion of them, with another part possibly being sent to the Bishop of Dorpat to be used in the war against the Russians. However, the Land Master was not happy with this explanation, and ordered the erection of roadblocks on all routes towards the castle of the Archbishop, Kokenhusen, to prevent the troops from reaching it. The magistrate of Riga, being caught in an awkward position, did not want anything to do with it, returning a letter from the Swedish commander, saying they did not understand the language.

The Land Master convened an assembly at Wenden, where he reaffirmed pledges of loyalty and decided to issue a sharp reprimand to the Archbishop, on account of bringing foreign Bohemian and Swedish troops into the country. The Swedish commander was not let into the assembly, however, one of his letters was read out loud, in which it stated that he had not come to engage in fighting, but instead to make peace, as both the Pope and the Holy Roman Emperor had ordered the Swedish government to protect the Bishopric of Riga, but that he would defend the church with force if necessary.

The Livonian Order's troops quickly advanced toward Salis, and the Archbishop either did not dare or could not give the Swedes any reinforcements. Because of this, the Swedish troops were unable to achieve anything against the troops of the Teutonic Order, and were too weak to handle a confrontation on their own, not receiving enough support from the Archbishop and his followers. As a consequence, the Swedes capitulated in the winter of 1478 after eight days, under an agreement that they would have free passage to go back to Sweden once the ice thawed.

The Land Master would then capture one castle after another from the Archbishop, and he and his followers would later be imprisoned by the Order. This campaign can be seen as an early Swedish desire to expand south of the Gulf of Finland.

As a result, Sweden's conflict with the Order had come to an end for the time being, especially as hostilities from the Russians against both made an alliance against Russia more desirable. However, the tense relationship between the Livonian Order on one side and the citizens of Riga and the cathedral chapter was far from over.

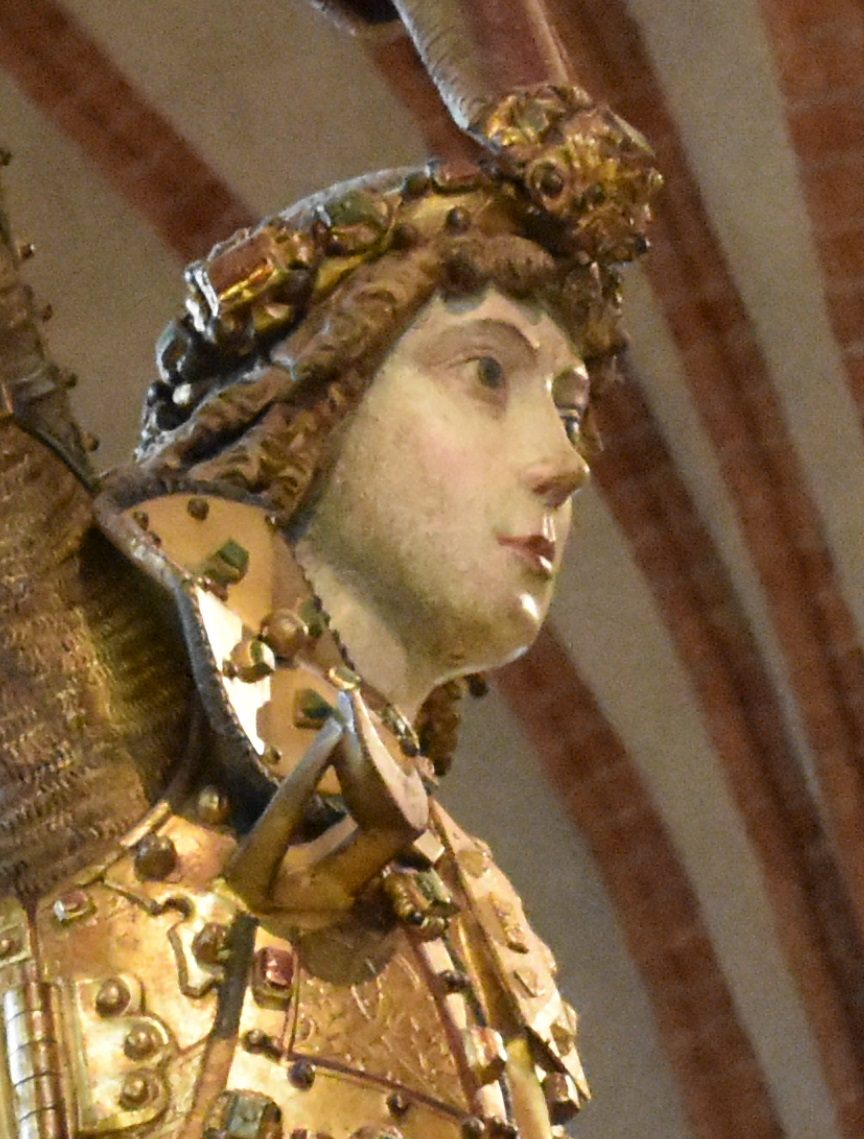
Youth portrait of Sten Sture the Elder

=== Third war (1485–1488) ===
In the early 1480s, tensions would once again rise between Riga and the Teutonic Order. In the late fall of 1483, the Archbishop of Riga, Stefan Grube, wrote a letter to Sten Sture asking for help. Sten Sture would respond positively, as Sweden had interests in Livonia. Not only was Livonia an important trading partner, Sture also wanted to prevent Danish influence from spreading there, with any Danish expansion there contributing to the encirclement of Sweden by Denmark. In 1484, Sture wrote to his "friends" in the council of Reval, proposing a joint action to support Riga, however, for the time being, Swedish involvement remained on paper.

In 1485, Sten Grube would pass away, and the Pope appointed Michael Hildebrand to be his successor. Hildebrand was known as a friend to the Teutonic Order, leading to the residents of Riga being very dissatisfied with his appointment, and a war between Riga and the Order became inevitable.

Representatives from both the cathedral chapter and the diocese nobility arrived in Stockholm in the fall of 1485, and on 1 October a treaty was concluded. The Swedish government, taking on the role as protector of the Rigan church, committed to supporting the diocese to the fullest extent, if certain conditions for reconciliation between the new Archbishop and the Land Master was not accepted. Per this, the Swedes agreed to send an armed force with the representatives to defend them.

A large Swedish force, under Knight Erik Nilsson Gyllenstierna, consisting of cavalry and foot soldiers, departed from Stockholm on 28 October and arrived to Dünamünde around 4 November, in order to support the council in Riga. According to another plan, Knut Posse was also supposed to send a force from Finland, with it being directed to Harrien or Wirland, Ivar Axelsson Tott had also promised his support or had received orders to support Posse.

Gyllenstierna was well received in Riga, and sent word to both the Land Master and Archbishop with letters from the Swedish government demanding a response within a 14-day timespan. However, the Land Master delayed, citing a meeting taking place in Wolmar on 17 January. They had hoped Riga would be burdened with maintaining the large Swedish force and forced to disperse. However, instead of fighting, Gyllenstierna called for further negotiations and renewed the treaty with the cathedral chapter in Riga, the Nobility, and its citizens on 24 December. He also negotiated wages for his troops if they were needed after Easter and compensation for losses at sea and release from prison. The new Archbishop, Hildebrand, who was a central figure in the war, was the first to concede He met with representatives from Riga at Treiden on January 6, 1486, accompanied by a canon from Uppsala, Johan von Mechelen. The Archbishop quickly agreed to the terms set in Stockholm, with a minor reservation that required the approval of the Pope.

The next day, representatives from the Order also arrived and warmly received Gyllenstierna. The negotiations continued, leading to a meeting in Riga on 20 February, which bishops and prelates from Courland, Ösel, and Dorpat would attend. The Archbishop was cooperative and was brought into Riga ceremoniously, confirming the articles presented to him, the most important of them being the establishment of a diocesan or regional council. In May 1486, peace would be established between Hildebrand and Riga, and Sweden would conclude peace with the Teutonic Order in 1488.

== Aftermath ==
After the conclusion of peace, the city of Riga was quickly forced to submit to the Order.

== Works cited ==
- Sundberg, Ulf (1998). Medeltidens svenska krig [Swedish wars in the Middle Ages] (in Swedish) (1st ed.). Stockholm: Hjalmarson & Högberg Bokförlag. ISBN 978-91-89080-26-3.
- Sundberg, Ulf (2010). Sveriges krig 1448-1630 [Sweden's wars 1448-1630] (in Swedish). Svenskt militärhistoriskt bibliotek. ISBN 9789185789627.
- Styffe, Carl Gustaf (1875). Bidrag till Skandinaviens historia ur utländska arkiver: Sverige i Sten Sture den äldres tid, 1470-1503 [Contribution to the history of Scandinavia from foreign archives: Sweden in the age of Sten Sture the Elder, 1470-1503] (in Swedish). Norstedts förlag.
