= Treaty of Habenhausen =

1666 treaty ending the Second Swedish war on Bremen

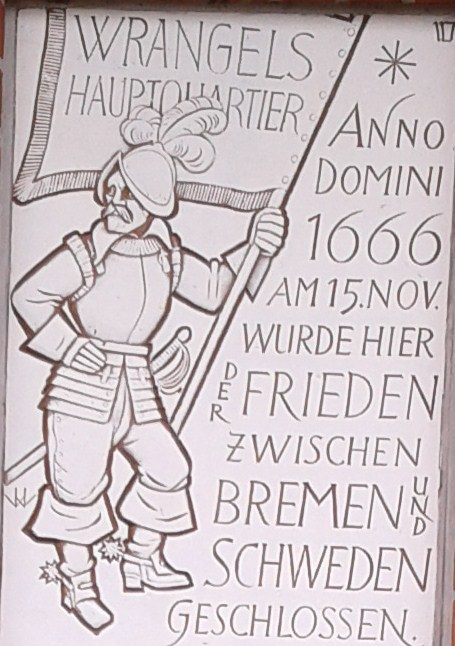
Memorial plaque for the Habenhauser Frieden at the former site of the "Swedenscheune."

The Treaty of Habenhausen was the result of peace negotiations after the Second Swedish war on Bremen between Sweden and the city of Bremen. Negotiations in Habenhausen began on 15 November 1666. Bremen had lost most of its merchant fleet during the war but had kept control of the city itself through the support of foreign powers.

The main conditions of the treaty were:

- Bremen reserves the right to obey directly under the Holy Roman Emperor, but will not visit the parliament before the year 1700, and the city may not use the title of Imperial immediacy in public documents within this period.
- Bremen must pay taxes to both the Swedish Crown and to the Holy Roman Emperor.
- Bremen to give up its status as a free city at the end of the then current Imperial Diet session. In practice this clause did not take effect as the session lasted until the collapse of the Holy Roman Empire in 1806.

Disputes over the use of the River Weser led to a fight between Bremen merchants and Swedish privateer in April 1668 and in 1672 Sweden built and fortified Carlsburg lower down the river and implemented tax exemptions and religious tolerance in the city in an attempt to attract merchants and take over control of the river trade.
