= List of bishops, prince-bishops, and administrators of Verden =

This is a list of bishops, prince-bishops, and administrators of Verden. The Catholic Diocese of Verden (German: Bistum Verden), was a suffragan of the Archdiocese of Mainz. From the 12th century, the Bishop of Verden was also, ex officio, a prince of the Holy Roman Empire and the ruler of a state in imperial immediacy — the Prince-Bishopric of Verden (German: Hochstift Verden. The Prince-Bishopric was established in 1180 and disestablished in 1648. The city of Verden upon Aller was the seat of the cathedral and the cathedral chapter. The bishop also resided there until 1195 when the residenz was moved to Rotenburg upon Wümme.

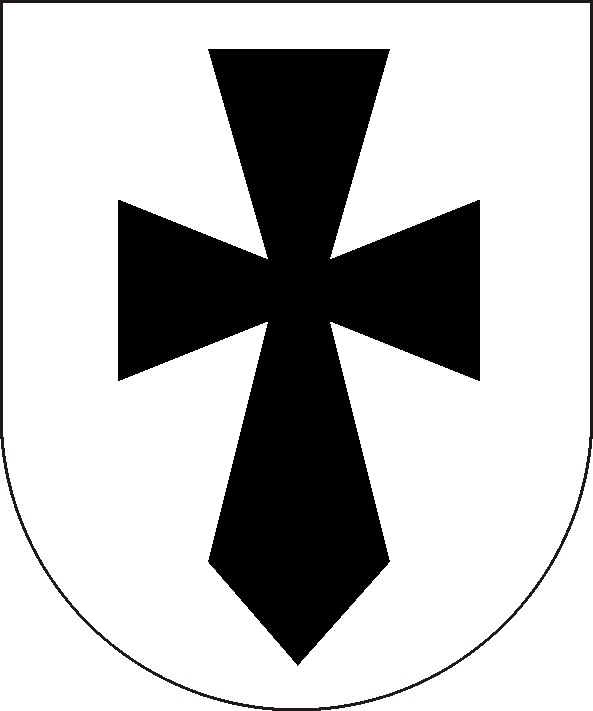
Coat-of-arms of the Prince-Bishopric of Verden

== Titles of the incumbents of the Verden See ==
Not all incumbents of the Verden See were imperially invested princely power as Prince-Bishops and not all were papally confirmed as bishops. In 1180 part of the Verden diocesan territory were disentangled from the Duchy of Saxony and became an own territory of imperial immediacy called Prince-Bishopric of Verden, a vassal of the Holy Roman Empire. The prince-bishopric was an elective monarchy, with the monarch being the respective bishop usually elected by the Verden cathedral chapter, and confirmed by the Holy See, or exceptionally only appointed by the Holy See. Papally confirmed bishops were then invested by the emperor with the princely regalia, thus the title prince-bishop. However, sometimes the respective incumbent of the see never gained a papal confirmation, but was still invested the princely regalia. Also the opposite occurred with a papally confirmed bishop, never invested as prince. A number of incumbents, elected by the chapter, neither achieved papal confirmation nor imperial investiture, but as a matter of fact nevertheless de facto held the princely power. The respective incumbents of the see bore the following titles:

- Bishop of Verden until 1180
- Prince-Bishop of Verden from 1180 to 1566 and again 1630 to 1631
- Administrator of the Prince-Bishopric of Verden 1566 to 1630 and again 1631 to 1645. Either simply de facto replacing the Prince-Bishop or lacking canon-law prerequisites the incumbent of the see would officially only hold the title administrator (but nevertheless colloquially referred to as Prince-Bishop). From 1566 to 1630 and again 1631 to 1645 all administrators were Lutherans.

== Catholic Bishops of Verden till 1180 ==
Roman Catholic Bishops of Verden till 1180
Episcopate	Portrait	Name	Birth and death with places	Reason for end of office	Notes
no assured dates		Swibrecht	unknown		legendary, not substantiated, any relation to Verden denied
no assured dates		Spatto also Patto	Ireland, unknown–30 March 788?	death	also abbot at Amorbach Abbey
no assured dates		Tancho of Verden also Tanco, Tanko	Ireland, unknown – 16 December 808?	death	also abbot at Amorbach Abbey; martyr (murdered by pagans), saint, feast day: 16 February
809–829		Harud also Haruth	Ireland, unknown – 15 June 829	death	also abbot at Amorbach Abbey; first bishop of assured information
829–831		sede vacante			
831–838		Helmgaud also Haligad	unknown – 21 January 841	death	
838–847		sede vacante			
847–849		Waldgar also Waltgar, Walter	unknown – 7 September 865?	death	
849–868		sede vacante			
868–874		Erlulf also Erlulphus (Lat.), Herluf	Ireland?, unknown – 10 May 874	death	martyr (murdered by pagans), saint, feast day: 2 February; in 1631 Prince-Bishop Francis of Wartenberg fled Verden taking Erlulf's relics with him to Regensburg
874–908		Wigbert of Verden also Wikbert	unknown – 8 September 908	death	great-grandson of Widukind
908–913		Bernhar I	unknown – 20 October 913	death	
913–933		Adalward (House of Immeding)	unknown – 27 October 933	death	teacher and promoter of his relative Adaldag
933–962		Amalung Billung also Amelung (House of Billung)	unknown – 5 May 962	death	brother of Hermann Billung
962–976		Bruno Billung also Brun as Bruno I (House of Billung)	unknown – 7 March 976	death	nephew of his predecessor and son of Wichmann the Elder, received immunity for the diocese by Emperor Otto I
976–993		Erpo of Verden also Adelperio, Albertus, Erp, Herpo (House of Erponids)	unknown – 19 February 993	death	before provost of Bremen Cathedral, Erpo received from Emperor Otto III the regalia of coinage, of hunting in the Sturmigau region (comparable to the future prince-bishopric), of holding markets and of punishment for the diocesan subjects
993–1013		Bernhar II	unknown – 25 July 1013	death	
1013–1031		Wigger of Verden also Wigher	unknown – 16 August 1031	death	before provost of Cologne Cathedral, fixed the diocesan border towards the diocese of Halberstadt
1031–1034		Thietmar of Verden also Dietmar as Thietmar I	unknown – 26 June 1034	death	
1034–1049		Count Bruno of Walbeck also Brun as Bruno II	unknown – 20 August 1049	death	brother of Bishop Thietmar of Merseburg
1049–1060		Siegbert of Verden also Sizzo	unknown – 9 October 1060	death	Henry IV granted him a manor in Hermannsburg and the Magetheide forest
1060–1076/1084		Richbert	unknown – 29 November 1084	death	he and his bailiff Hermann Billung the Younger ravaged the neighbouring archdiocese of Bremen
1076–1085		sede vacante			
1085–1097		Hartwig of Verden also Hartwich	unknown – 14 October 1097	death	
1097–1116		Mazo of Verden	unknown – 25 October 1116	death	Mazo enfeoffed Lothair of Süpplingenburg as inheritable diocesan bailiff (military protector)
1116–1148		Thietmar of Plötzkau also Dietmar as Thietmar II (House of Plötzke)	unknown – 23 September 1148	death	arbiter in the dispute between Henry the Lion and Bremen's Archbishop Adalbero on the County of Stade
1149–1167		Hermann Behr (House of Behr)	c. 1110 – 11 August 1167, near Rome	death	before member of the Halberstadt cathedral chapter, disputed with Archbishop Hartwig I of Bremen on the common diocesan border since the former settled uninhabited areas within the Verden diocese (second mile of Altes Land), in 1148/1150 Hermann falsified documents to fictitiously date back the foundation of the Verden see to 786, claiming Bremen's suffragans sees Ratzeburg and Mecklenburg were actually part of the Verden diocese, Hermann spent much of his time at the court of Frederick Barbarossa in Italy (1158–1161, 1162–1163, and 1166–1167)
1167–1180		Hugo of Verden	unknown – 1 March 1180	death	Hugo confirmed the foundation of the Lüne Nunnery in 1172, he spent much of his time at the court of Frederick Barbarossa in Italy (1174–1175, and 1176–1178)

== Catholic Prince-Bishops (1180–1566) ==
Roman Catholic Prince-Bishops of Verden (1180–1566)
Reign and episcopate	Portrait	Name	Birth and death with places	Reason for end of office	Notes
1180–1188		Tammo of Verden	unknown – 7 December 1188	death	at the carve-up of Saxony in 1180 Tammo gained for about a quarter of the diocese, where the see held already considerable privileges, the territorial princely power, establishing the Prince-Bishopric of Verden; Tammo endowed the nunnery in Arendsee in 1184, consecrated the St. Michael's Abbey in Hildesheim in 1186, and privileged the Collegiate Church of Bardowick
1189–1205		Rudolph of Verden as Rudolph I	unknown – 29 May 1205	death	before official in the imperial chancery, Emperor Henry VI granted Verden diocese half the castle and half the Saltworks of Lunenburg and estates in the Bardengau in 1192, he erected the castle of Rotenburg upon Wümme as prince-episcopal residence in 1195, he founded the old monastery in today's Buxtehude-Altkloster in 1197, and participated in the Crusade of 1197/1198
1205–1231		Count Iso of Wölpe also Yso of Welpe (Counts of Wölpe)	1167 – 5 August 1231	death	before provost at the collegiate church in Bardowick and at the Verden Cathedral, at his investiture he stipulated with the chapter the oldest prince-episcopal capitulation recorded in Verden, laying ground for the co-rule by the chapter, in 1211/1212 and 1213–1215 he participated in the Livonian Crusade, south of Verden city he gained the lordship of Westen as part of the prince-bishopric in 1219/1220; in 1223 Iso gained the bailiwick (secular protection) over the diocese, a prior Guelphic subfief, he founded the collegiate church of St. Andrew with 12 prebendaries in Verden endowing it with the revenues of Hollenstedt archdeaconry and the revenues of the parishes of Estebrügge, Zesterfleth, Jork and Mittelnkirchen, the latter four in the Verden diocesan area belonging to the political territory of the Prince-Archbishopric of Bremen
1231–1251		Luder of Borch also Lüder vun Borg, Lothar von Berg	unknown – 28 June 1251, Verden	death	Luder conflicted with Duke Otto the Child on the latter's prince-episcopal fiefs, since Otto strove to convert Verden's subfiefs into fiefs of imperial immediacy, Luder founded Cistercian monasteries in Medingen and Steinbeck upon Luhe (1243), Luder was steward of Brunswick and Lunenburg while its Duke Otto the Child was on the Prussian Crusade in 1238
1251–1269		Count Gerard of Hoya also Gerhard as Gerard I (Counts of Hoya)	unknown – 4 May 1269	death	granted the city of Verden town privileges in 1259, laying the grounds for its future development as free city. Gerhard accepted speakers of the nobility, holding estates in the prince-bishopric, as their representation, thus establishing the third power having a say in the government, besides the bishop and the cathedral chapter; son of Henry II, Count of Hoya
1269–1300		Duke Conrad of Brunswick and Lunenburg also Konrad as Conrad I (House of Welf)	unknown – 15 September 1300	death	son of Duke Otto the Child, due to minority only administrator of the prince-bishopric until his consecration as bishop in 1285, Conrad reconstructed the burnt cathedral following the model of Reims Cathedral after 1274, Conrad was the guardian of his fatherless nephew Duke Albert II of Brunswick and Lunenburg (Wolfenbüttel line), supporting him against his elder brother Duke Henry I. After the brothers partitioned their duchy in 1286 Albert II granted Conrad Hellwege, Neuenkirchen, the patrimonial jurisdiction over Verden rural area, Dörverden, Schneverdingen, Visselhövede and Scheeßel as part of the prince-bishopric in 1288, in the same year Conrad richly endowed the cathedral chapter with revenues from the episcopal share in the Lunenburg salt mines
1300–1312		Frederick Man of Honstädt as Frederick I	unknown – 9 January 1312	death	uncle of his successor
1312–1332		Nicolaus Ketelhot also Kettelhodt or Kesselhut	unknown – 11 February 1332	death	since 1305 provost of St. Andrew Collegiate Church in Verden, between 1312 and 1231 he served as administrator and vicar general (this as of 1322) of the Prince-Archbishopric of Bremen, supported by Vicar General Dietrich von Xanthen
1332–1340		Johannes Hake also Hacke, or John of Göttingen as John I	Göttingen, 1280 – 3 October 1349, Avignon	became Prince-Bishop of Freising in 1341 (as John II)	probably son of Göttingen's city councillor Conrad Hake, Johannes studied medicine in Montpellier, professor of Montpellier University (since 1314), in 1324 papally provided as Bishop of Cammin (denied by the chapter there), first prince-bishop of Verden not elected by the chapter, but only papally appointed, lacking support in chapter and nobility, therefore residing mostly in Avignon, and for only some months ever in 1333 within his diocese, however outside the prince-bishopric, to be precise in Lunenburg, which belonged to the Principality of Lunenburg as to secular rule. Mostly represented by his vicar general Godfrey of Werpe, who successfully defended the prince-bishopric against Guelphic conquest attempts
1340–1342		sede vacante			
1342–1363		Daniel of Wichtrich	unknown – March 1364	death	before Carmelite friar and auxiliary bishop of Archbishop-Elector Baldwin of Luxembourg in the Archbishopric-Electorate of Triers, not elected by the Verden chapter, but only papally appointed, lacking support in chapter and nobility he had a weak standing as prince-bishop, after less than a year in office leaving his diocese until 1350, now forced to conquer the prince-bishopric ruled by the chapter, then mostly residing in the castle in Rotenburg upon Wümme, he lacked the Guelphic support during the Lunenburg Succession War between the Welfs and the Ascanians, so he left his diocese again in 1355 only to return to Rotenburg once in summer 1362. In return for their aid Daniel alienated many diocesan fiefs to the Welfs.
1363–1365		Gerard of Schalksberg also Gerhard vom Berge as Gerard II	unknown – 15 November 1398	became Prince-Bishop of Hildesheim (1365–1398)	elected by the chapter
1365–1367		Rudolf Rühle also Rule von Friedeberg, Rudolph of Friedeberg as Rudolph II	Friedberg in the Wetterau, c. 1320 – 3 July 1367, Prague (likely)	death	son of Johann Rühl from Friedberg, studied at Bologna University, endowed with prebendaries in several dioceses he became an official in the chancery of Emperor Charles IV, while his service the chancery authored the Golden Bull, not elected by the Verden chapter, but only papally appointed
1367–1381		Henry of Langlingen also Langeln as Henry I	unknown – 23 January 1381	death	elected by the Verden chapter, before provost of the Lüne Nunnery, in 1371 Henry I further privileged the city of Verden, empowering it against the cathedral chapter, Henry I helped the Guelphic Duke Magnus II Torquatus, Prince of Wolfenbüttel to finance the Lunenburg Succession War by granting him a credit against the pawn of Magnus' castles in Kettenburg, Lauenbrück, and Rethem upon Aller, as well as his bailiwick of Wahlingen. After Magnus' defeat the Ascanian victors Albert of Lunenburg and his uncle Wenceslas I of Saxe-Wittenberg subjected the prince-bishopric in 1378, imposed the return of the pawns with repayment and a war alliance between Verden and the Principality of Lunenburg.
1381–1388		John Gryse of Zesterfleth also Johann as John II	c. 1314 – 11 December 1388, Rotenburg upon Wümme	death	in 1376 during the War on Lunenburgian Succession still as dean of the Bremen chapter Zesterfleth entered into psychological warfare and publicly alleged Albert of Brunswick and Lunenburg (Wolfenbüttel), as Albert II Prince-Archbishop of Bremen, were a Hermaphrodite; elected by the Verden chapter, as a partisan of the Ascanians in the Lunenburg Succession War he gained their support, eased the relation between prince-bishopric and the Ascanian-ruled Principality of Lunenburg, even gaining the confirmation of the Verden fiefs to the Lunenburg princes in 1386, but in May the Welfs defeated the Ascanians making any agreements with the Ascanians void and endangering the prince-bishopric as Ascanian partisan, in July 1388 Zesterfleth brokered the compromise between the two fighting parties
1388–1395		Duke Otto of Brunswick and Lunenburg (Wolfenbüttel) (House of Welf)	c. 1364 – 30 June 1406	on 29 May 1395 he became Prince-Archbishop of Bremen (1395–1406) as Otto II	son of Duke Magnus II Torquatus, Prince of Wolfenbüttel, elected by the Verden chapter pressurised by the Welfs, Otto turned out to be a willing partisan of his brothers, by 1389 the estates of the Bremen Prince-Archbishopric appointed Otto as regent for his spendthrift uncle Prince-Archbishop Albert II
1395–1398/1401 (de facto/de jure)		Dietrich of Nieheim also Niem or Nyem	Nieheim, c. 1345 – 22 March 1418, Maastricht	resignation	before Roman Curial, not elected by the Verden chapter, but only papally appointed, he finally failed to take the see and returned to the Roman Curia in 1403.
1398–1399		Conrad of Vechta as Conrad II	Bremen (likely), c. 1370 – 24 December 1431, Roudnice nad Labem	deposed after the downfall of his benefactor King Wenceslaus of the Romans.	Bishop of Olomouc (1409–1412) and Archbishop of Prague (1413–1421)
1399–1400 and again 1402–1407		Conrad of Soltau as Conrad III	Lunenburg, c. 1350 – 2 January 1407, Rotenburg	death	papally provided as Bishop of Verden on 8 August 1399, papally deposed on 6 February 1400, on 18 May 1401 King Rupert of Germany invested him as Prince-Bishop of Verden, papally confirmed in 1402, before professor at Charles University in Prague, and Ruperto-Carola University in Heidelberg, on 6 February 1400 provided as Bishop of Cambrai, however this was blocked by an incumbent appointed by the pope in Avignon, Conrad III failed to move the see from Verden to St. John's in Lunenburg against the resistance of the princes of Lunenburg and the city council of Lunenburg
1407–1426		Count Henry of Hoya as Henry II (Counts of Hoya)	unknown – 15 February 1441	resigned on 14 August 1426	on 21 February 1407 the Verden chapter elected him bishop, confirmed by Pope Benedict XIII of Avignon (one of the popes during the Western Schism), Henry II de facto held the princely power, without being imperially invested, Henry II was not accepted as bishop in the diocesan area within the Principality of Lunenburg until 1417, after the Welfs' preferred rivalling Prince-Bishop Ulrich left for Seckau they refused to swear him the oath of vassalage for their fiefs granted by the bishop of Verden and deprived Henry II of the prince-episcopal castle in Rotenburg
1407-1409/1417		Ulrich of Albeck	unknown – 12 December 1431, Padua	appointed Bishop of Seckau (1417–1431) by Pope Martin V	provided by Pope Gregory XII of Rome, invested as prince-bishop by King Rupert, however, never gained princely power in the prince-bishopric proper, but residing in Lunenburg, deposed by Pope Alexander V of Avignon in 1409 without effect, serving as bishop in the diocesan area within the Guelphic Principality of Lunenburg until 1417
1426–1470		John of Asel also Johannes as John III	1380 – 21 June 1472, Rotenburg	supposedly resigned	
1470–1502		Berthold of Landsberg also spelled Bertold	unknown – 4 June 1502, Rotenburg	death	since 1481 simultaneously Prince-Bishop of Hildesheim as Berthold II
1502–1558		Duke Christopher the Spendthrift (House of Welf)	1487 – 22 January 1558, Tangermünde	de facto dismissal as prince by Chapter and Estates	also Prince-Archbishop of Bremen (1511–1542/1547 and again 1549–1558), he usually resided in Rotenburg
1558–1566		Duke George of Brunswick and Lunenburg (Wolfenbüttel) (House of Welf)	22 November 1494 – 4 December 1566	death	brother of the former, simultaneously Prince-Archbishop of Bremen (1558–1566)

== Lutheran Administrators of the Prince-Bishopric (1566–1630) ==
Lutheran Administrators of the Prince-Bishopric (1566–1630)
Reign and episcopate	Portrait	Name	Birth and death with places	Reason for end of office	Notes
1566–1586		Eberhard of Holle	Uchte, 1531/32 – 5 July 1586, Lübeck	death	also papally confirmed and imperially invested Prince-Bishop of Lübeck (1561–1586), since 1564 coadjutor of his predecessor George, however, never papally confirmed and imperially invested as prince-bishop of Verden
1586–1623		Duke Philip Sigismund of Brunswick and Lunenburg (Wolfenbüttel) (House of Welf)	Hessen am Fallstein, 1 July 1568 – 19 March 1623, Iburg	death	simultaneously Administrator of the Prince-Bishopric of Osnabrück (1591–1623)
1623–1629		Frederick, Prince of Denmark as Frederick II (House of Oldenburg)	Haderslev, 18 March 1609 – 9 February 1670, Copenhagen	on 26 May 1629 expelled by the Catholic League and deposed by the Edict of Restitution	reascending administratorship in 1635

== Catholic Prince-Bishop (1630–1631) ==
Roman Catholic Prince-Bishop of Verden (1630–1631)
Reign and episcopate	Portrait	Name	Birth and death with places	Reason for end of office	Notes
1630–1631		Francis William of Wartenberg	Munich, 1 March 1593 – 1 December 1661, Ratisbon	deposed by the Swedish conquerors	papally appointed, lacking the capitular elective mandate also Prince-Bishop of Osnabrück (1625–1634 and again 1648–1661), of Ratisbon (1649–1661), and Vicar Apostolic of the Archdiocese of Bremen (1645/1648)

== Lutheran Administrators of the Prince-Bishopric (1631–1645) ==
Lutheran Administrators of the Prince-Bishopric (1631–1645)
1631–1634	Duke John Frederick of Schleswig-Holstein at Gottorp (House of Holstein-Gottorp)	Gottorp, 1 September 1579 – 3 September 1634, Altkloster	death	also administrator of the prince-bishoprics of Bremen (1596–1634), and Lübeck (1607–1634)
1634–1635	rule by Chapter and Estates due to sede vacante			
1635–1645	Frederick of Denmark as Frederick II (House of Oldenburg)	Haderslev, 18 March 1609 – 9 February 1670, Copenhagen	resignation by Second Peace of Brömsebro	simultaneously administrator of the Prince-Archbishopric of Bremen (1634–1645), expelled from both sees by the Swedes, since 1648 King of Denmark as Frederick III
1645–1648	rule by the Swedish occupants			
after 15 May 1648	The Prince-Bishopric was converted into a hereditary monarchy, the Principality of Verden, first ruled in personal union by the Swedish crown. See List of princes of Verden (1648–1823).			

== Sources ==
- Arend Mindermann, Urkundenbuch der Bischöfe und des Domkapitels von Verden: 2 vols. (vol. 1: 'Von den Anfängen bis 1300' ISBN 978-3-931879-07-5; vol. 2: '1300 – 1380' ISBN 978-3-931879-15-0), Stade: Landschaftsverband der ehem. Herzogtümer Bremen und Verden, Stade, 2001 and 2004.
- Thomas Vogtherr (ed.), Chronicon episcoporum Verdensium = Die Chronik der Verdener Bischöfe, commented and translated, Stade: 1997, ISBN 978-3-931879-03-7
