= Bishopric of Verden =

Bishopric of Verden may refer to:

- Diocese of Verden, the ecclesiastical jurisdiction of the bishop of Verden
- Prince-Bishopric of Verden, the secular jurisdiction of the bishop of Verden
