= Diocese of Verden =

Diocese of the Catholic Church, 768–1648

The Diocese of Verden was a diocese of the Catholic Church. It was founded around AD 768 as a suffragan of the Archdiocese of Mainz. It was suppressed in 1648 as part of the Peace of Westphalia. The diocese was centered on the city of Verden an der Aller in what is today the state of Lower Saxony, Germany. The cathedral church of the diocese was dedicated to Ss Mary and Cecilia in 1028 but the building was only completed in 1490. The Bishop of Verden was also, ex officio, the ruler of a principality of the Holy Roman Empire — the Prince-Bishopric of Verden. The territory of the diocese was not identical with that of the prince-bishopric; while the state was located within the boundaries of the diocese, it amounted to less than a quarter of the diocesan territory. Its last bishop was Franz Wilhelm, Count von Wartenberg. Following the Thirty Years' War, Verden, along with the neighbouring sees of Minden and Bremen, fell into the hands of Protestants. Wartenberg was only able to retain the See of Osnabrück.

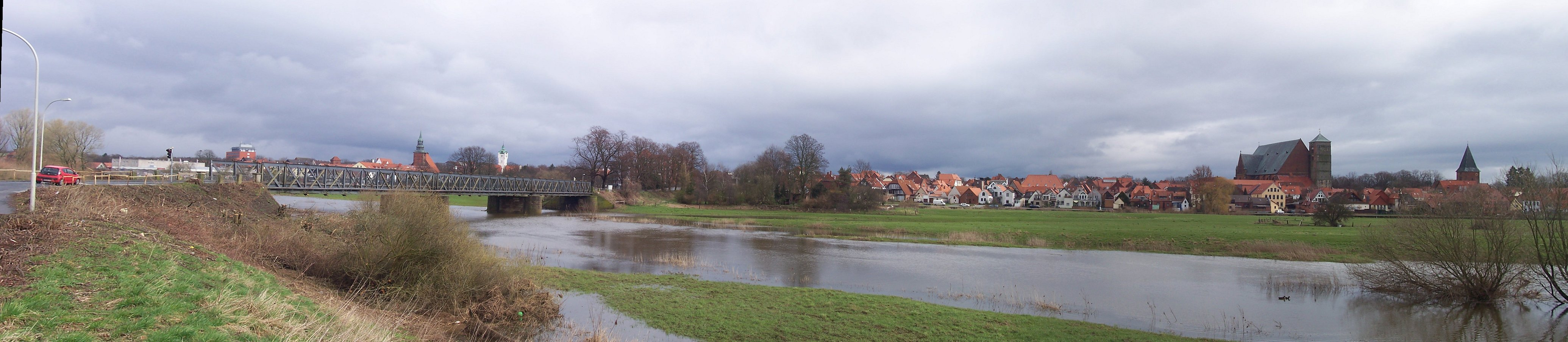
Floods on the River Aller near Verden an der Aller

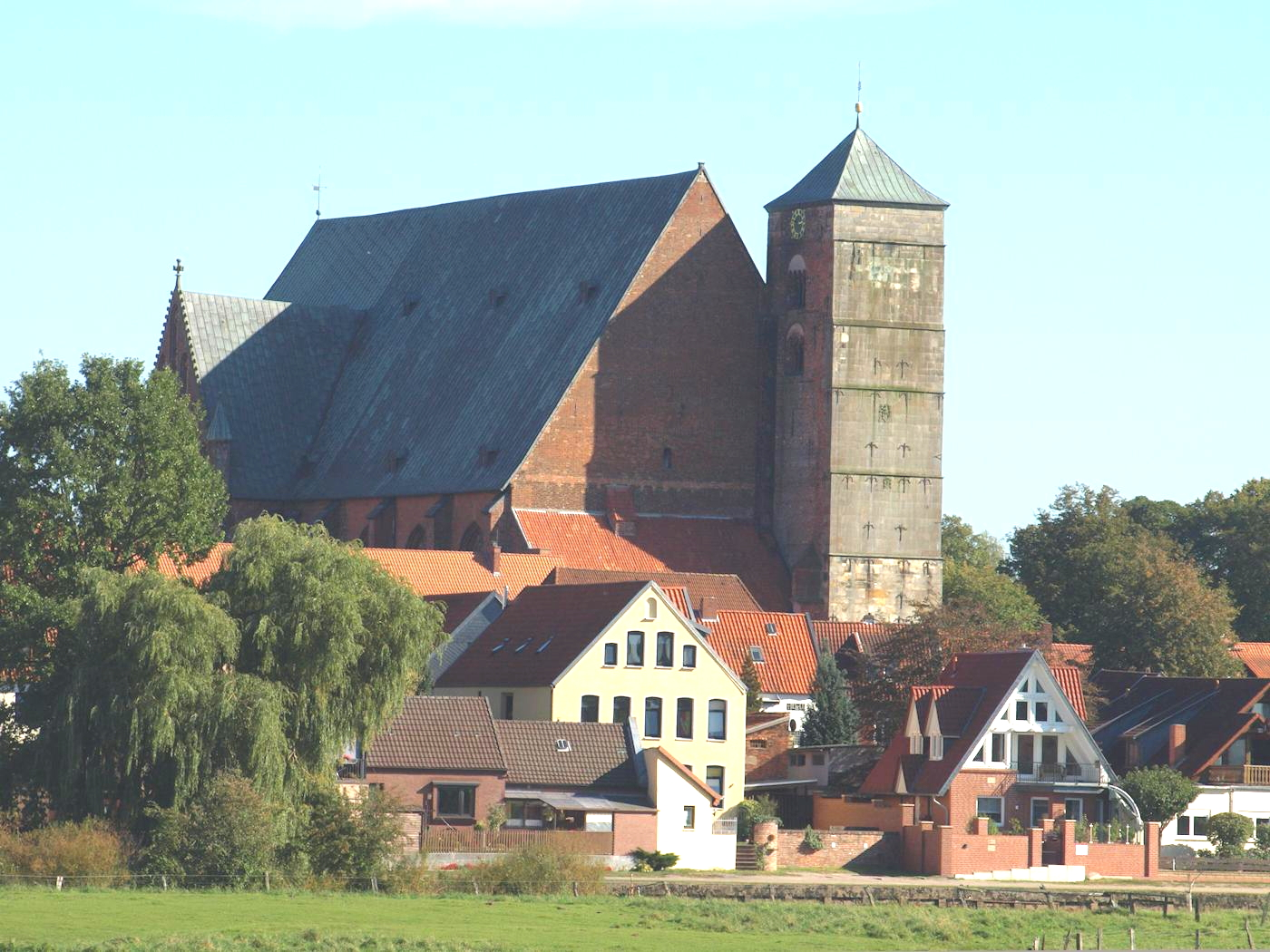
Cathedral of Ss Mary and Cecilia

== Formation ==
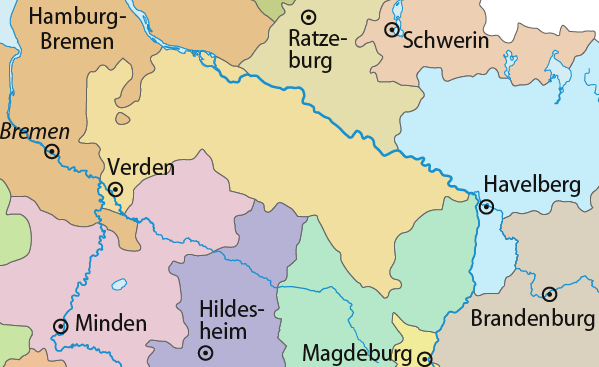
Diocese of Verden before the Reformation

Charlemagne, King of the Franks, introduced Christianity to Saxony around 780 and founded bishoprics at Minden and Verden. The first ten bishops were Irish or English men; they include Saint Erlulph (died 830). Verden had a relationship with Amorbach Abbey in the Odenwald. The abbey established a missionary centre in Verden an der Aller to assist in the conversion of the Saxons to Christianity. Many abbots from this centre later become Bishops of Verden. By the 9th century, the bishopric had become a political football for the regional nobility. For example, the Billungs promoted their favourite monks from Corvey Abbey to the episcopal throne.

The present district of Verden is roughly coterminous with the medieval gaue known as the Sturmigau.

In 985, Empress Theophanu, acting as regent for the Holy Roman Emperor Otto III, granted the Bishop of Verden the privilege to hold a market, to mint coins, and to raise taxes. Furthermore, the bishop was granted the "ban" privilege (Privilegium de non appellando) in the Sturmigau. These privileges formed the basis of the future prince-bishopric (Hochstift), which came into being with the carve-up of the old Duchy of Saxony in 1180.

Since the Investiture Controversy of the 11th and 12th centuries, it became the settled practice in the Holy Roman Empire for diocesan bishops to be elected by their cathedral chapters. This resulted in a double confirmation: once by the pope for the see and once by the emperor for the governorship of the imperial state. In practice, papally confirmed bishops were then invested by the emperor with the princely regalia. This meant that the first Prince-Bishop — Tammo of Verden — had responsibility for the spiritual welfare of the diocese and the temporal welfare of the principality which covered around a quarter of the diocesan territory.

In 1195, Prince-Bishop Rudolph I founded the castle of Rotenburg upon Wümme as a stronghold against the neighbouring Prince-Archbishopric of Bremen. Later, the castle served as the prince-episcopal Residenz.

== List of bishops, prince-bishops, and administrators ==
The incumbents of the see held the following titles over the years:

- Catholic: Bishop of Verden until 1180
- Catholic: Prince-bishop of Verden (1180—1566)
- Lutheran: Diocesan Administrator of the Prince-Bishopric of Verden (1566—1630).
- Catholic: Prince-bishop of Verden (1630—1631)
- Lutheran: Diocesan Administrator (1631—1645).

== Reformation ==
During the Protestant Reformation, the cathedral chapter of Verden began to elect candidates who did not conform to canon law (i.e. they were not validly ordained or they failed to secure papal confirmation). Such candidates only held the title of "Diocesan Administrator" but were colloquially called "Prince-Bishop". Three such Diocesan Administrators were elected between 1566 and 1630. In strict canon law, Verden was "sede vacante" during this period.

In 1630, by the terms of the Edict of Restitution, a Catholic bishop was appointed — Franz Wilhelm, Count von Wartenberg. He only able to hold office until 1631 or 1634. Thereafter, the diocese was suppressed and the Catholic Church was only represented by the Apostolic Vicariate of Northern Germany. Today, the territory of the diocese is part of the Roman Catholic Diocese of Hildesheim in the ecclesiastical province of Hamburg.

== Sources ==
- Catholic.org - Verden
- O'Hanlon, John (1875), Lives of the Irish Saints: with special festivals, and the commemorations of holy persons, vol. 2, Dublin: J. Duffy
- Arend Mindermann, Urkundenbuch der Bischöfe und des Domkapitels von Verden: 2 vols. (vol. 1: 'Von den Anfängen bis 1300' ISBN 978-3-931879-07-5; vol. 2: '1300 – 1380' ISBN 978-3-931879-15-0), Stade: Landschaftsverband der ehem. Herzogtümer Bremen und Verden, Stade, 2001 and 2004.
- Thomas Vogtherr (ed.), Chronicon episcoporum Verdensium = Die Chronik der Verdener Bischöfe, commented and translated, Stade: 1997, ISBN 978-3-931879-03-7
