= Eitel Frederick von Hohenzollern-Sigmaringen =

Catholic cardinal (1582–1625)

His Eminence The Most Reverend Eitel Frederick von Hohenzollern-Sigmaringen
- Prince-Bishop of Osnabrück
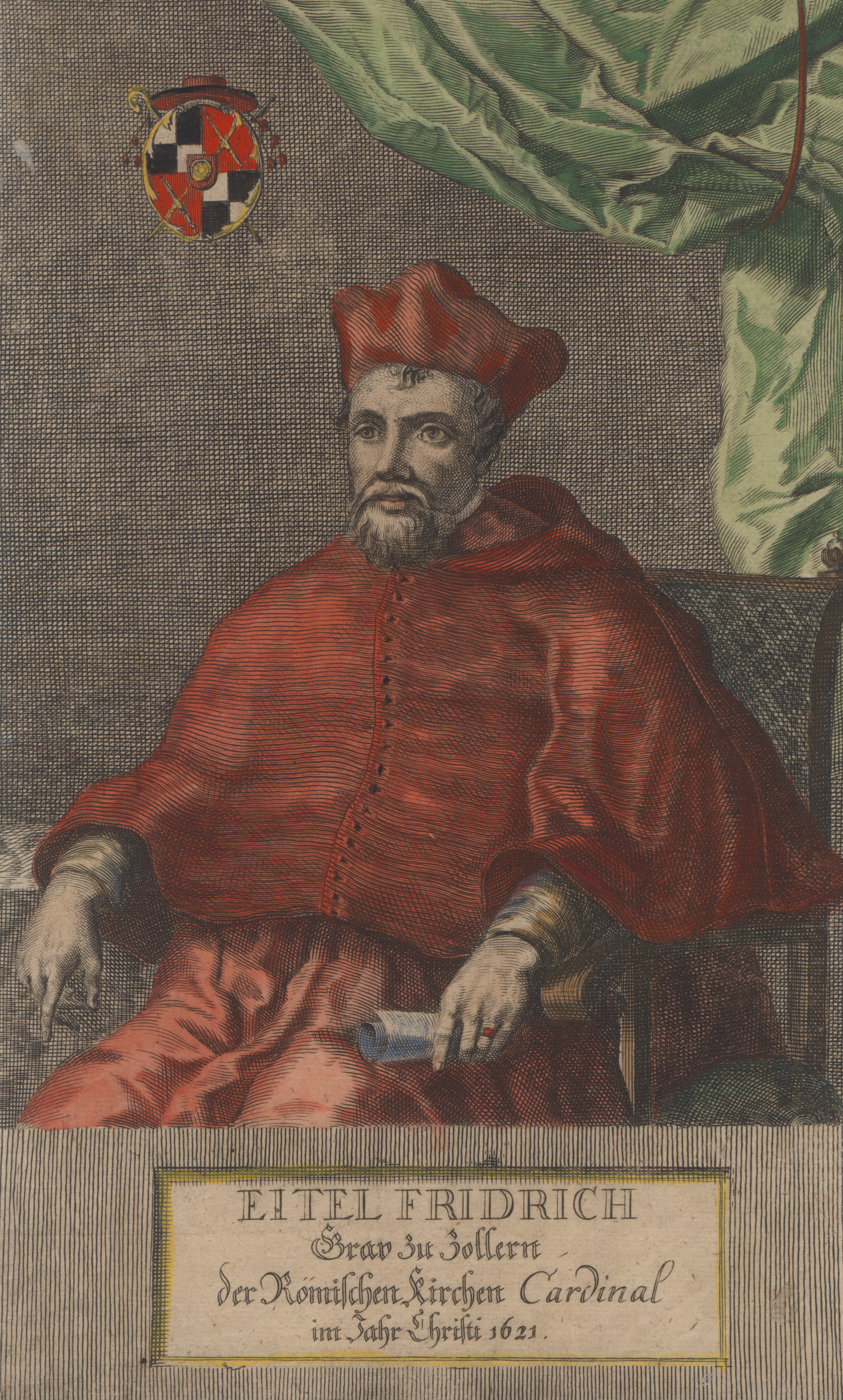
- Church: Roman Catholic
- Appointed: 19 April 1623
- Predecessor: Philip Sigismund
- Successor: Francis of Wartenberg

Orders
- Consecration: 29 October 1623 by Attilio Amalteo
- Created cardinal: 11 January 1621 by Paul V

Personal details
- Born: 25 September 1582 Sigmaringen
- Died: 19 September 1625 (aged 42) Iburg Castle, Bad Iburg

Eitel Friedrich von Hohenzollern-Sigmaringen (25 September 1582 – 19 September 1625) was a Roman Catholic Cardinal-Priest and Prince-Bishop of Osnabrück. He was a son of Charles II, Count of Hohenzollern-Sigmaringen and thus a member of the noble and ancient Hohenzollern-Sigmaringen family.

On the 15 December 1620 Pope Gregory XV created him Cardinal in pectore, he was publicly proclaimed Cardinal-Priest of S. Lorenzo in Panisperna on 11 Jan 1621. He was appointed Prince-Bishop of Osnabrück on 28 April 1623. On the 29 October 1623 he chose to become a priest and was ordained.

He was never styled Eminence as this was only done after his death in 1630.

Eitel Frederick von Hohenzollern-Sigmaringen House of Hohenzollern-Sigmaringen Cadet branch of the House of Hohenzollern Born: 26 September 1582 Died: 19 September 1625
Catholic Church titles
Regnal titles
Preceded by Philip Sigismund as Lutheran administrator	Prince-Bishop of Osnabrück; 1623–1625	Succeeded by Francis II as Catholic Prince-Bishop
