= Erlulph =

9th-century Scottish Catholic bishop and saint

Saint Erlulph
- Born: Scotland
- Died: 830; Eppokstorp, Northwest Germany
- Feast: 10 February

Erlulph (died 830) was a Scottish missionary and 10th Bishop of Verden who was martyred by pagans in Germany. His feast day is 10 February.

== Life ==
John O'Hanlon (1821–1905) wrote that very little is known of Erlulph's life and career beyond two paragraphs by the Bollandists for 2 February. John Colgan (1592–1658) classed him among the Irish saints. (Note: At this time Ireland was called Scotia, and the people of Ireland were called Scots.) Dempster gives his feast day as 22 February and Camerarius says it was 10 February.

Charlemagne introduced Christianity to Saxony around 780 and founded bishoprics at Minden and Verden. Some say that Erlulph died in 815. Another account says he died at a place named Eppockstorp or Ebbeckstorp in 830, 839 or 856, killed by pagan Saxons or Norsemen. Others say that he was the 10th bishop of Verden and was living there in 876. Dempster says that Erlulph was the 9th bishop of Verden and the last of the Scottish bishops.

The relics of the bishops were found in 1630 during repair of the old cathedral of Verden and were encased in a casket. In 1659 Bishop Francis William took the relics with him to Regensburg when he fled from the Swedes.

== Butler's account ==
The hagiographer Alban Butler wrote in his Lives of the primitive fathers, martyrs, and other principal saints (1798),

St. Erlulph, Bishop and Martyr, Native of Scotland SEVERAL Scottish missionaries passed into the North-western parts of Germany, to sow there the seeds of the faith, at the time when Charlemagne subdued the Saxons. In imitation of these apostolic men, saint Erlulph, an holy Scotchman, went thither, and after employing many years with great success in that arduous mission, was chosen the tenth bishop of Verdun. His zeal in propagating the faith enraged the barbarous infidels, and he was slain by them at a place called Eppokstorp, in 830. See Krantzius, l. 3. Metrop. c. 30. Democh. Catal. episc. Verd. Pantaleon, &c. (Note: This saint must not be confounded with Ernulph, a most holy man, the apostle of Iceland, who flourished in the year 890; on whom see Jonas, Histor. Islandiæ.)

== Sources ==
- Butler, Alban (1798), The lives of the primitive fathers, martyrs, and other principal saints..., J. Moir
- Mooney, Ambrose (2014), "St. Erluph of Werden, Bishop & Martyr", CelticSaints.org
- O'Hanlon, John (1875), Lives of the Irish Saints: with special festivals, and the commemorations of holy persons, vol. 2, Dublin: J. Duffy
