= Prince-Archbishopric of Bremen =

Ecclesiastical principality of the Holy Roman Empire from 1180 to 1648

Prince-Archbishopric of Bremen Erzstift Bremen/Herzogtum Bremen (German)
- 1180–1648
- Coat of arms

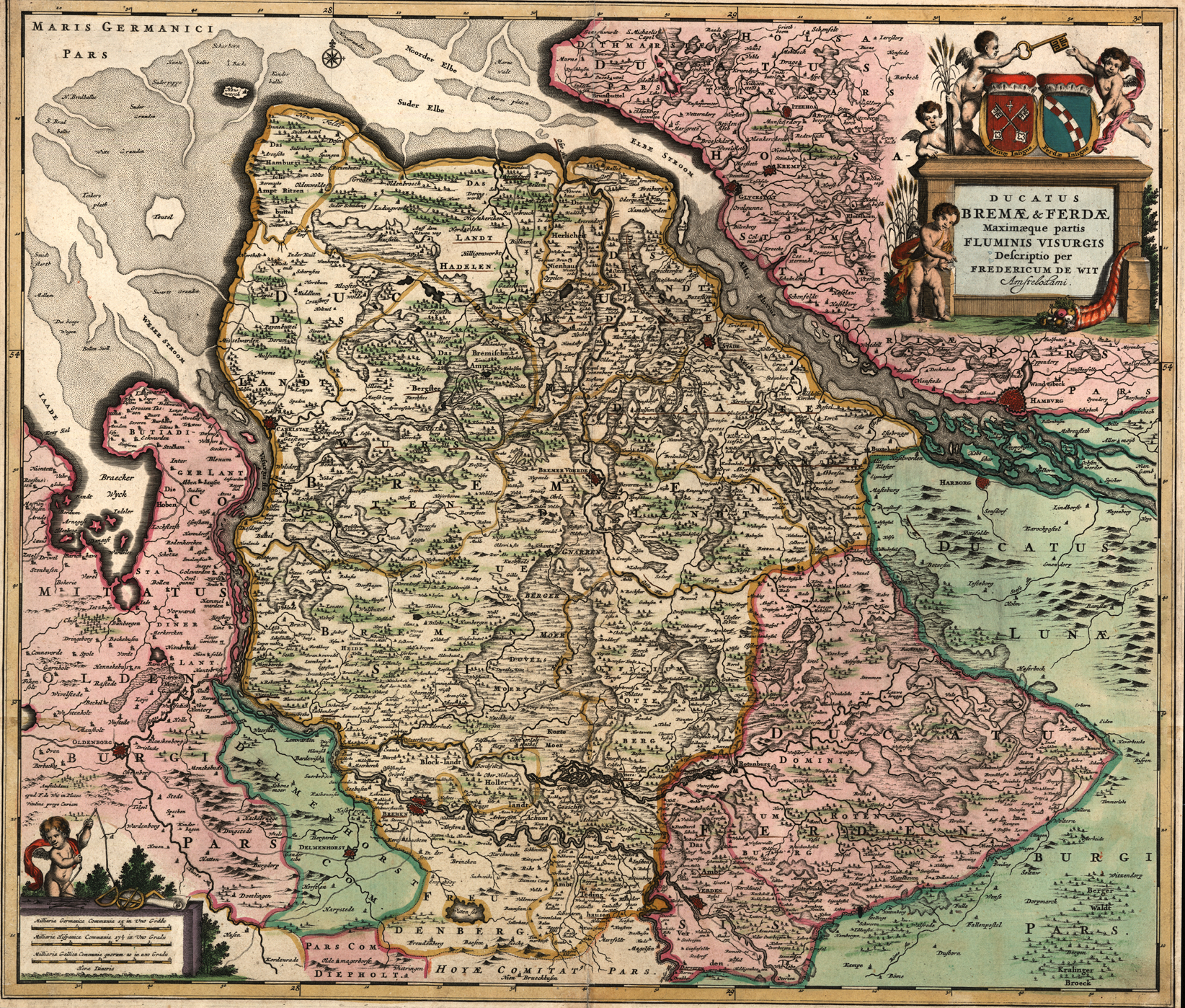
- The Duchy of Bremen around 1655, the Imperial City of Bremen is insufficiently demarcated, bottom right in pink the Duchy of Verden

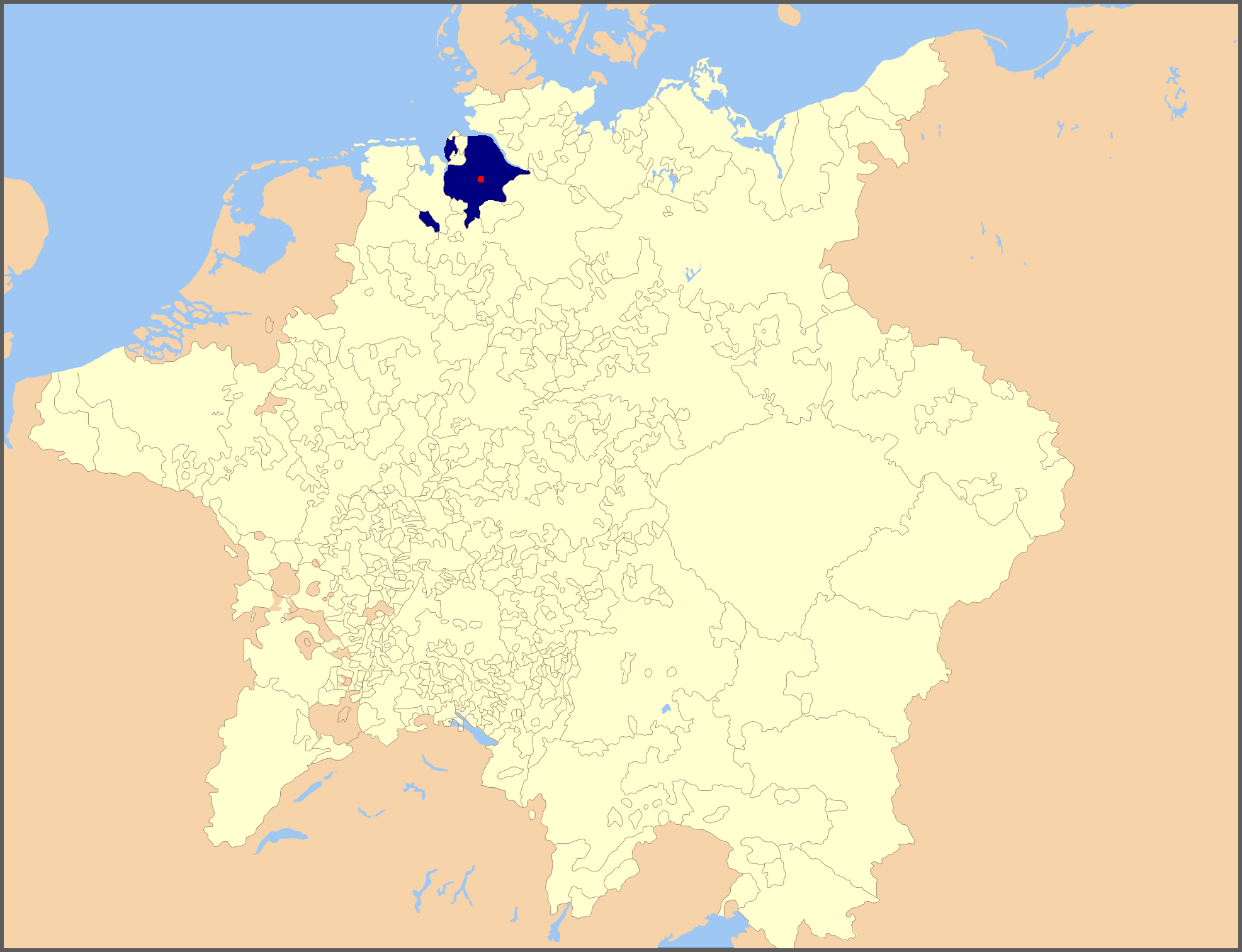
- Prince-Archbishopric of Bremen within the Holy Roman Empire (as of 1648), the episcopal residence (in Vörde) shown by a red spot.
- Status: Defunct
- Capital: Bremen (seat of chapter); Vörde (seat of govt from 1219); Basdahl (venue of Diets)
- Common languages: Northern Low Saxon, Frisian
- Religion: Catholic Church
- Government: Ecclesiastical principality
- Ruler: Prince-archbishop, administrator, or chapter (in vacancy)
  - 1180–1184: Prince-Archbishop Siegfried
  - 1185–1190: Prince-Archbishop Hartwig II
  - 1596–1634: Admin. John Frederick
  - 1635–1645: Administrator Frederick II
- High Bailiff (Landdrost)
- Legislature: Estates of the Realm (Stiftsstände) convening at Diets (Tohopesaten or Landtage) in Basdahl
- Historical era: Middle Ages
  - Break-up of stem duchy of Saxony: 1180
  - Bremen city de facto independent: 1186, especially from the 1360s
  - Conquered by Catholic League: Summer 1627
  - Conquered by Sweden, Bremen and Lübeck: 10 May 1632
  - Seized by Sweden: 13 August 1645
  - Secularised as the Duchy of Bremen: 15 May 1648
- Currency: Reichsthaler, Bremen mark
Preceded by
Duchy of Saxony
Succeeded by
Bremen-Verden
Free Hanseatic City of Bremen
Dithmarschen
- Today part of: Germany

The Prince-Archbishopric of Bremen (German: Fürsterzbistum Bremen) was an ecclesiastical principality (787–1566/1648) of the Holy Roman Empire and the Catholic Church that after its definitive secularization in 1648 became the hereditary Duchy of Bremen (German: Herzogtum Bremen). The prince-archbishopric, which was under the secular rule of the archbishop, consisted of about a third of the diocesan territory. The city of Bremen was de facto (since 1186) and de jure (since 1646) not part of the prince-archbishopric. Most of the prince-archbishopric lay rather in the area to the north of the city of Bremen, between the Weser and Elbe rivers. Even more confusingly, parts of the prince-archbishopric belonged in religious respect to the neighbouring Diocese of Verden, making up 10% of its diocesan territory.

== History ==
=== Early diocese of Bremen ===
The foundation of the diocese belongs to the period of the missionary activity of Willehad on the lower Weser. It was erected on 15 July 787 at Worms, on Charlemagne's initiative, his jurisdiction being assigned to cover the Saxon territory on both sides of the Weser from the mouth of the Aller, northwards to the Elbe and westwards to the Hunte, and the Frisian territory for a certain distance from the mouth of the Weser.

Willehad fixed his headquarters at Bremen, though the formal constitution of the diocese took place only after the subjugation of the Saxons in 804 or 805, when Willehad's disciple, Willerich, was consecrated bishop of Bremen, with the same territory. The diocese was conceivably at that time a suffragan of the archbishops of Cologne, this is at least how they later corroborated their claim to supremacy over the Bremian see.

=== Archdiocese of Hamburg-Bremen ===
After the death of Bishop Leuderich (838–45), the see was given to Ansgar, Archbishop of Hamburg. From that time on the see of Bremen was permanently united with the Archdiocese of Hamburg.

The new combined see was regarded as the headquarters for missionary work in the Nordic countries, and new sees to be erected were to be its suffragans, meaning subject to its jurisdiction. Ansgar's successor, Rimbert, the "second apostle of the north", was troubled by onslaughts first by Normans and then by Wends, and by Cologne's renewed claims to supremacy.

At Archbishop Adalgar's (888–909) instigation Pope Sergius III confirmed the amalgamation of the Diocese of Bremen with the Archdiocese of Hamburg to form the Archdiocese of Hamburg and Bremen, colloquially called Hamburg-Bremen, and by so doing he denied Cologne's claim as metropolia over Bremen. Sergius prohibited the chapter at Hamburg's Concathedral to found suffragan dioceses of its own.

After the Obodrite destruction of Hamburg in 983 the Hamburg chapter was dispersed. So Archbishop Unwan appointed a new chapter with twelve canons, with three each taken from Bremen Cathedral chapter, and the three colleges of Bücken, Harsefeld and Ramelsloh. In 1139 Archbishop Adalbero had fled the invasion of Count Rudolph II of Stade and Count Palatine Frederick II of Saxony, who destroyed Bremen, and established in Hamburg also appointing new capitular canons there by 1140.

=== Bremen's Diocesan Territory and its Suffragans ===
Hamburg-Bremen's diocesan territory covered about today's following territories: The Bremian cities of Bremen and Bremerhaven, the Free and Hanseatic City of Hamburg (north of Elbe), the Lower Saxon counties of Aurich (northerly), Cuxhaven, Diepholz (northerly), Frisia, Nienburg (westerly), Oldenburg in Oldenburg (easterly), Osterholz, Rotenburg upon Wümme (northerly), Stade (except of an eastern tract of land), Wesermarsch, Wittmund, the Lower Saxon urban counties Delmenhorst and Wilhelmshaven, the Schleswig-Holsteinian counties of Ditmarsh, Pinneberg, Rendsburg-Eckernförde (southerly), Segeberg (easterly), Steinburg, Stormarn (easterly) as well as the Schleswig-Holsteinian urban counties of Kiel and Neumünster.

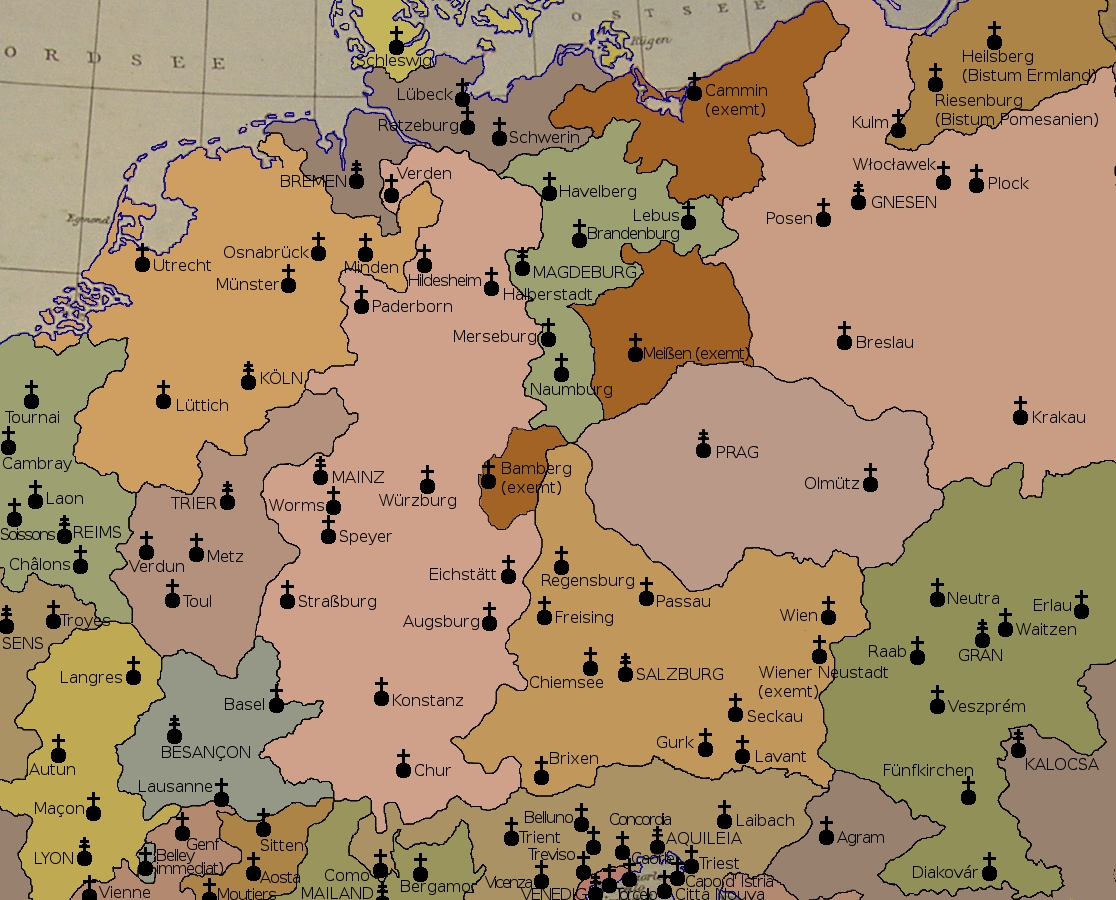
The Bremian ecclesiastical province (dark grey) with its remaining three suffragans around 1500, thus after disentangling Bremen's Scandinavian suffragan dioceses, as well as neighbouring provinces in Central Europe.

The see of Hamburg-Bremen attained its greatest prosperity and later had its deepest troubles under Archbishop Adalbert of Hamburg (1043–1072), whose ambitions to become a Patriarch of the North failed. Hamburg stopped being used as part of the diocese's name. The next two archbishops, Liemar and Humbert, were determined opponents of Pope Gregory VII.

Under the latter in 1104 Bremen's suffragan Diocese of Lund (DK) was elevated to an archdiocese supervising all of Bremen's other Nordic former suffragan sees, to wit Århus (DK), Faroe Islands (FO), Gardar (Greenland), Linköping (S), Odense (DK), Orkney (UK), Oslo (N), Ribe (DK), Roskilde (DK), Schleswig (D), Selje (N), Skálholt (IS), Skara (S), Strängnäs (S), Trondheim (N), Uppsala (S), Viborg (DK), Vestervig (DK), Västerås (S) and Växjö (S).

Bremen's remaining suffragan sees at that time were only existing by name, since insurgent Wends had destroyed the so-called Wendish dioceses of Oldenburg-Lübeck, Ratzeburg and Schwerin and they were only to be reestablished later. At the stripping of the Duchy of Saxony (7th century - 1180) in 1180 all of these suffragan bishops achieved for parts of their diocesan territories the status of imperially immediate prince-bishoprics. The Bishopric of Livonia (first at Uexküll then Riga) was a suffragan of Bremen in the years 1186–1255.

=== The Prince-Archbishopric of Bremen after 1180 as a territory of imperial immediacy ===
==== Gaining Grounds for a Prince-Archbishopric of Imperial Immediacy ====
Holy Roman Emperor Frederick I Barbarossa and his allies, many of them vassals and former supporters of his paternal cousin Duke Henry III, the Lion, had defeated the Duke of Saxony and Bavaria. In 1180 Frederick I Barbarossa stripped Henry the Lion of his duchies. In 1182 he and his wife Matilda Plantagenêt, the daughter of Henry II of England and Eleanor of Aquitaine and sister of Richard Lionheart left from Stade to go into exile from the Holy Roman Empire in order to stay with Henry II of England.

Frederick I Barbarossa partitioned Saxony in some dozens of territories of Imperial Immediate status allotting each territory to that one of his allies who had conquered them before from Henry the Lion and his remaining supporters. In 1168 the Saxon clan of the Ascanians, allies of Frederick I Barbarossa, had failed to install their family member Count Siegfried of Anhalt, on the see of Bremen.

But in 1180 the Ascanians prevailed twofoldly. The chief of the House of Ascania, Margrave Otto I of Brandenburg, son of Albert the Bear, a maternal cousin of Henry the Lion, provided his sixth brother Bernhard, Count of Anhalt, from then on Bernhard III, Duke of Saxony, with the later on so-called younger Duchy of Saxony (1180 - 1296), a radically belittled territory consisting of three unconnected territories along the river Elbe, from north west to south east, (1) Hadeln around Otterndorf, (2) around Lauenburg upon Elbe and (3) around Wittenberg upon Elbe. Except of the title, Duke of Saxony, Angria and Westphalia, which this younger Duchy of Saxony granted its rulers, even after its dynastic partition in 1296, this territory, consisting only of territorial fringes of the old Duchy of Saxony, had little in common with the latter. In 1260, with effect from 1296 on, its rulers split the younger Duchy into the Duchies of Saxe-Wittenberg (German: Herzogtum Sachsen-Wittenberg) and Saxe-Lauenburg (German: Herzogtum Sachsen-Lauenburg), the latter holding the unconnected two northern territories, belonging both to the archdiocese of Bremen.

Otto and Bernhard helped their second brother Siegfried, who since 1168 had called himself the Bishop Elect of Bremen, to gain the see of Bremen, with part of the diocesan territory being upgraded to form the Prince-Archbishopric of Bremen (German: Erzstift Bremen). Thus the Prince-Archbishopric of Bremen became one of the successor states of the old Duchy of Saxony, holding only a small part of its former territory.

In 1186 Frederick I Barbarossa recognised the city of Bremen as a political body by the Gelnhausen Privilege. With the consent of Prince-Archbishop Hartwig II, of Uthlede the emperor declared the city to be governed by its burghers and the emperor, with the Prince-Archbishop waiving his say. The city of Bremen regarded and still regards this privilege to be constitutive for its status as a Free imperial city of imperial immediacy.

Through the history the respective rulers of the Prince-Archbishopric and its successor state Bremen-Verden often denied the city's status. And also the city could and did not always cling to its claim of imperial immediacy, which made the city's status somewhat ambiguous. Through most of the history the city participated in the Prince-Archbishopric's Diets as part of the Estates (see below) and paid its share in the taxes, at least when it had consented to the levying before. Since the city was the major taxpayer, its consent was mostly searched for. Like this the city wielded fiscal and political power within the Prince-Archbishopric, while the city would rather not allow the Prince-Archbishop or his representatives to rule in the city against its consent.

After the Bremen Cathedral chapter, overlooking the three enfranchised Hamburg capitulars, had elected Valdemar of Denmark, the deposed Bishop of Schleswig, archbishop in 1207, Bremen's cathedral dean Burchard of Stumpenhusen, who had opposed this election, fled to Hamburg, then under Danish influence. King Valdemar II of Denmark, in enmity with his father's cousin Archbishop Valdemar, gained the Hamburg chapter to elect Burchard as anti-archbishop in early 1208. Lacking papal support, King Valdemar II himself invested him as Archbishop Burchard I, however, only accepted in North Elbia.

In 1219 the Bremen Chapter again ignored the Hamburg capitulars, fearing their Danish partisanship and elected Gebhard of Lippe archbishop. In 1223 Archbishop Gebhard reconciled the Hamburg chapter and confirmed that three of its capitulars were enfranchised to elect with the Bremen chapter, to wit the provost, presiding the chapter, the dean (Domdechant) and the scholaster, in charge of the education at the cathedral school. Pope Honorius III confirmed this settlement in 1224, also affirming the continued existence of both chapters.

The fortified city of Bremen held its own guards, not allowing prince-archiepiscopal soldiers to enter it. The city reserved an extra very narrow gate, the so-called Bishop's Needle (Latin: Acus episcopi, first mentioned in 1274), for all clergy including the Prince-Archbishop. The narrowness of the gate made it technically impossible to come accompanied by knights. Therefore, the Prince-Archbishops rather preferred to reside outside of the city, first in Bücken and later in the Vörde Castle, which became the principal fortress of Prince-Archbishop Gerhard II, Edelherr zur Lippe in 1219.

The Chapters of Bremen Cathedral (see below) and part of the administration were located within the city boundary in a district of immunity and extraterritorial status (German: Domfreiheit, literally: Cathedral Liberty) around the Cathedral of St. Peter, where the city council would refrain to interfere. The Hamburg Concathedral with chapterhouse and capitular residential courts formed a Cathedral Immunity District of the Prince-Archbishopric of Bremen too.

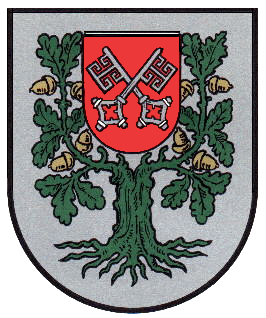
The coat of arms of the Bremian municipality Hagen im Bremischen shows in the middle the coat of arms of the Prince-Archbishopric of Bremen.

The key, the epithet symbol of the Saint Simon Petrus, has become the symbol of the city of Bremen (see Coat of arms of Bremen), the Prince-Archbishopric of Bremen (two criss-crossed argent (silver) keys on a gules (red) background, see in the left part of the Bremen-Verden's seal) and of the Bremian city of Stade.

The territory of the Prince-Archbishopric of Bremen consisted of a number of sub-entities. The only thing they all had in common was, that the prior archbishops or capitulars or the Chapter as a collective obtained some secular power in them by way of purchase, application of force, usurpation, commendation, pledge, donation etc. The prior archiepiscopal authorities didn't have succeeded in almost any of the sub-entities to gain all the power, be it judicial, patrimonial, parochial, fiscal, feudal or else what. Almost everywhere the rule was to be shared with one or more competing bearers of authority, e.g. aristocrats, outside ecclesiastical dignitaries, autonomous corporations of free peasants (German: Landsgemeinden) or chartered towns and the like. Therefore, the archiepiscopal authority used to refer to each sub-entity by different terms like county, parish, shire, bailiwick or patrimonial district, each according to the particular power, which the archiepiscopal authority had achieved in them.

The Prince-Archbishopric of Bremen's former territory consists about of today's following Lower Saxon counties (German: Landkreis, or Kreis) of Cuxhaven (southerly), Osterholz, Rotenburg upon Wümme and Stade as well as of the Bremian exclave of the city of Bremerhaven and from 1145 to 1526 today's Schleswig-Holsteinian county of Ditmarsh. The city of Bremen was legally a part of the bishopric until 1646, but de facto ruled by its burghers and didn't tolerate the prince-archbishop's residence within its walls any more since 1313. Therefore, the prince-archbishop moved to Vörde (German pronunciation: [ˈføːɐdə]). Verden's former prince-bishopric's territory is represented about by the eastern part of the modern County of Verden and the southern part of today's County of Rotenburg, both in Lower Saxony.

==== Constitution and Politics within the Prince-Archbishopric ====
In relation to the interior the archiepiscopal authority, consisting of Prince-Archbishop and cathedral chapter, had to find ways to interact with the other bearers of authority. These were gradually transforming into the Bishopric's Estates (German: Stiftsstände), a prevailingly advisory body, but decision-taking in fiscal and tax matters. The bishopric's Estates again were by no means homogenous and therefore often quarreled for they consisted of the hereditary aristocracy, the service gentry, non-capitular clergy, free peasants and burghers of chartered towns. The modus vivendi of interplay of the Estates and the archiepiscopal authority, being in itself divided into the Prince-Archbishop and the Chapter, became the quasi constitution of the Prince-Archbishopric. However, the interplay was not determined by fixed standards of behaviour. While the consecutive Archbishops worked on discarding the bishopric's Estates from the political landscape, the latter fought for the enforcement of the modus vivendi to become a real constitution. The Chapter often swung between increasing its influence by fighting the Estates jointly with the Prince-Archbishop and repelling his absolutist intentions by making common cause with the Estates. All parties made use of means like bluffing, threat, obstructionism, corruption, horse-trading and even violence.

In 1542/1547 - 1549 Chapter and Estates managed to dismiss the autocratic and prodigal Prince-Archbishop Christopher the Spendthrift, Duke of Brunswick and Lunenburg-Wolfenbüttel. Especially the Chapter used its power to elect very old candidates, to minimise the time a ruler can be harmful, or to elect minors, which it hoped to dress and tame in time. Once in a while the Chapter took up time and protracted elections for years, being itself the ruler for the time of sede vacante. During the dismissal of Prince-Archbishop Christopher the Spendthrift the chapter ruled together with the Estates which had gained at that time substantial power.

In relation to the outside the Prince-Archbishopric of Bremen had the status of an imperial estate (German: Reichsstand, plural: Reichsstände) with a vote in the Diet (German: Reichstag) of the Holy Roman Empire. A prerequisite for being an imperial estate was imperial immediacy (German: Reichsunmittelbarkeit, or Reichsfreiheit) of the rulers or ruling bodies, meaning that they had no other authority above them except of the Holy Roman Emperor himself. Furthermore, such rulers or ruling bodies (such as Chapters or city councils) possessed several important rights and privileges, including a degree of autonomy in the rule of their territories.

In their pastoral and religious capacity as Roman Catholic cleric the archbishops led their archdiocese as the hierarchical superior of all Roman Catholic clergy, including the suffragan bishops of Oldenburg-Lübeck, Ratzeburg and Schwerin.

==== Decline of the Prince-Archbishopric's Independence ====
The Prince-Archbishopric often suffered from military supremacy of neighbouring powers. Having no dynasty, but prince-archbishops of different descent, the Prince-Archbishopric became a pawn in the hands of the powerful. The establishment of a constitution, which would bind the conflicting Estates, failed.

Schisms in Church and State marked the next two centuries, and in spite of the labours of the Windesheim and Bursfelde congregations, the way was prepared for the Reformation, which made rapid headway, partly because the last Roman Catholic prince-archbishop, Christopher the Spendthrift, was in permanent conflict with the Chapter and the Estates. Being simultaneously the Prince-Bishop of Verden, he preferred to reside in the city of Verden.

By the time he died (1558), in the Prince-Archbishopric nothing was left of the old denomination apart from a few monasteries – such as Harsefeld, Himmelpforten, Lilienthal, Neuenwalde, Osterholz as well as Zeven under the jurisdiction of the Bremian archdiocese and Altkloster as well as Neukloster under the jurisdiction of Verden's See – and the districts served by them. While between 1523 and 1551 the cities of Bremen and Stade had dissolved all the urban monasteries, except of St Mary's in Stade, which transformed until 1568 into a Lutheran convent, and conveyed their buildings to uses by schools, hospitals, alms houses and senior homes.

==== The Era of the Lutheran Administrators of the Prince-Archbishopric ====
The constitution of the Holy Roman Empire provided, that the Emperor may only enfeoff a prince-bishop elect with the regalia, if the Pope would have confirmed his election to the respective See. In default thereof the Emperor could grant a liege indult (German: Lehnsindult), often restricted to some years only, and then notwithstanding enfeoff the prince-bishop elect with the regalia of restricted legitimacy to the effect that the elect could rule with princely power within the prince-bishopric, bearing only title of Administrator, but would be banned from participating in the Diets. Lacking papal confirmation and imperial liege indult could bring a prince-bishop elect into the precarious situation to be dismissed by the Emperor or by any of his vassals powerful enough and keen to do so.

Once the inhabitants of the Prince-Archbishopric had adopted Lutheranism and partially Calvinism, as did the city of Bremen and the territories under its influence downstream the Weser and in the district of Bederkesa, also most capitulars, recruited from burghers of the city of Bremen and rural noble families, turned out to be Calvinists and Lutherans. Thus the capitulars preferred to elect Protestant candidates. The Bremian prince-archbishop elects could only occasionally gain the imperial liege indult.

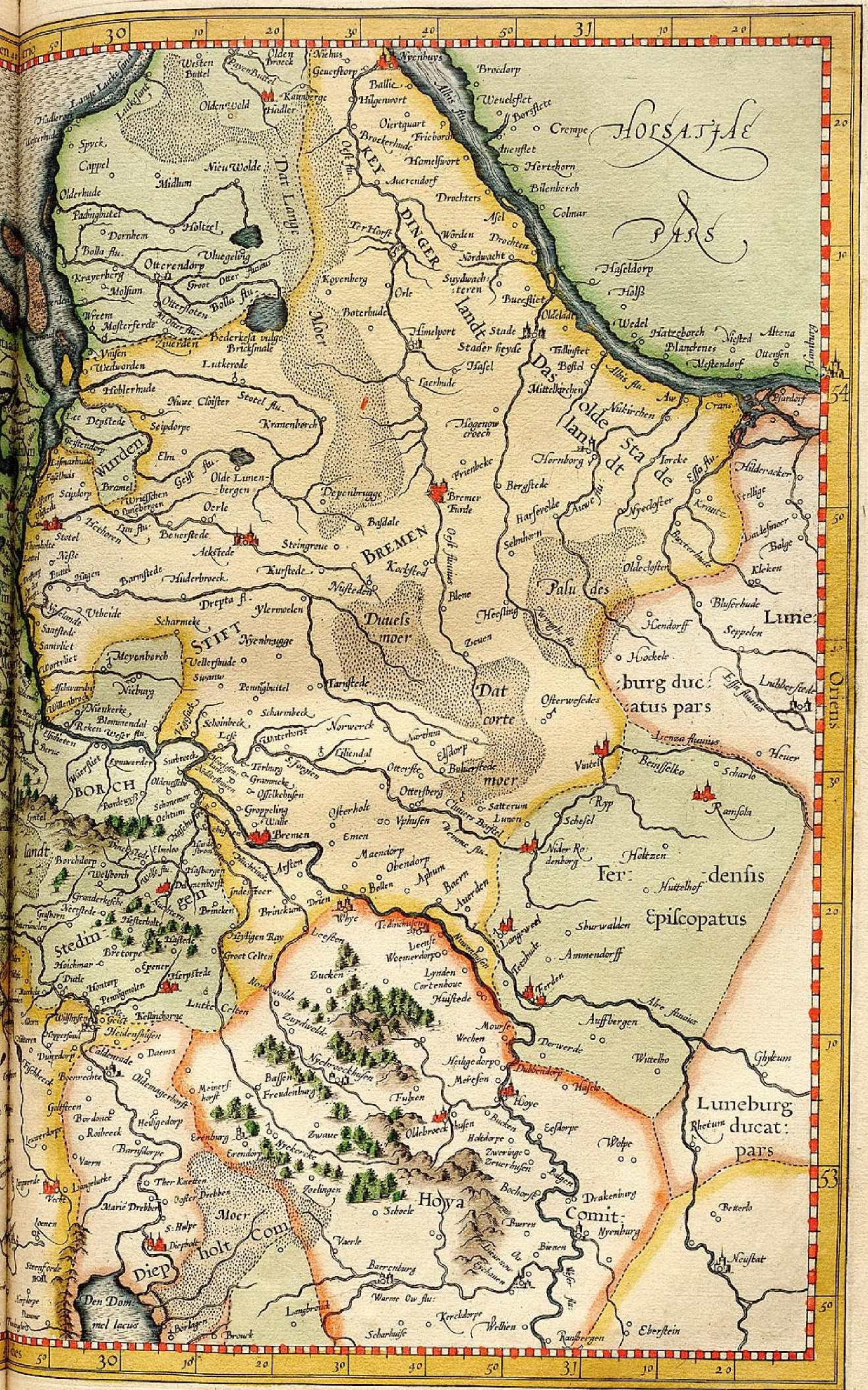
Territory of the Prince-Archbishopric from a late 16th-century atlas

Many princely houses, such as the House of Guelf (Brunswick and Lunenburg-Wolfenbüttel), the House of Nikloting (Mecklenburg-Schwerin), the House of Wettin (Electorate of Saxony), and the House of Ascania (Saxe-Lauenburg) applied for the See. Before electing a new prince-archbishop the Chapter took its time, ruling the Prince-Archbishopric in accordance with the Estates (1566–1568), and considered the opportunities.

In 1524 the Prince-Archbishopric had subjected the autonomous farmers' republic of the Land of Wursten, but the Wursteners still hoped for a liberation and support from the neighbouring Saxe-Lauenburgian exclave of the Land of Hadeln. Thus on 17 February 1567 the Chapter elected Duke Henry III of Saxe-Lauenburg (*1550-1585*, ruled from 1568 on) prince-archbishop. In return his father Francis I waived any Saxe-Lauenburgian claim to the Land of Wursten as well as to the district of Bederkesa and abandoned the lawsuit, which he had brought to the Imperial Chamber Court to this end.

In his election capitulations Henry III covenanted to accept the privileges of the Estates and the existing laws. Due to his minority he agreed, that Chapter and Estates would rule the Prince-Archbishopric. In this time he should work towards a papal confirmation. De facto he ascended the See in 1568, gained an imperial liege indult in 1570, while de jure still represented by the Chapter until 1580, in order not to complicate a papal confirmation, which never materialised.

While Maximilian II regarded Henry III a true Catholic, Pope Sixtus V remained a skeptic. Henry III was raised Lutheran, but educated Catholic and served before his election as Catholic canon of the cathedral in Cologne. The schism wasn't so definite, as it looks in retrospect. The Holy See still hoped the Reformation would be a merely temporary phenomenon, while its protagonists still expected all the Roman church to reform, so that there would be no schism.

So Sixtus V tested Henry III once in a while, demanding the succession of Catholic candidates for vacancies in the Bremian Chapter - which it sometimes accepted, sometimes denied -, while Henry succeeded to be also elected by the Chapters of the prince-bishoprics of Osnabrück (1574–1585) and Paderborn (1577–1585), without ever gaining papal confirmation. In 1575 Henry III and Anna von Broich (Borch) married in Hagen im Bremischen.

As to the interior Henry III still had to repay debts from his pre-predecessor Christopher the Spendthrift. In 1580 Henry introduced a Lutheran church constitution for the Prince-Archbishopric. Thus Henry III would not exercise the pastoral functions of a Roman Catholic bishop any more. In 1584 the Holy See founded the Roman Catholic Nordic Missions, an endeavour for pastoral care and mission in the area of the de facto ceased archdioceses of Bremen and of Lund. In 1622 the Nordic Missions were subordinated to the Congregatio de Propaganda Fide in Rome. The Holy See conveyed to the Nuncio to Cologne, Pietro Francesco Montoro, the task to look after the Nordic Missions in - among others - the Prince-Archbishopric of Bremen and the Prince-Bishopric of Verden. In 1667 the Holy See further institutionalised the Nordic Missions by establishing the Vicariate Apostolic of the Nordic Missions.

On 22 April 1585 Henry III died in his residence in Beverstedtermühlen after a riding accident. After Henry's early death, Duke Adolf of Schleswig-Holstein-Gottorp wielded influence at the Bremian Chapter to elect his son John Adolphus of Schleswig-Holstein at Gottorp (*1575-1616*) to the See. To this end, Adolf paid 20,000 rixdollars and promised to work towards the restitution of Ditmarsh to the Prince-Archbishopric.

In 1585 John Adolf covenanted at his election in the obligatory election capitulations, that he would accept the privileges of the Chapter as well as the existing laws and that he would work - at his own expense - towards gaining either papal confirmation or - in default thereof - an imperial liege indult. From 1585 to 1589 Chapter and Estates ruled the Prince-Archbishopsric in custodianship for the minor John Adolf.

==== The Prince-Archbishopric during the Thirty-Years War (1618-1648) ====
At the beginning of the Thirty Years' War the Prince-Archbishopric maintained neutrality, as did most of the territories in the Lower Saxon Circle. After 1613 King Christian IV of Denmark and Norway, being in personal union Duke of Holstein within the Holy Roman Empire, turned his attention to gain grounds by acquiring the prince-bishoprics of Bremen, Verden, Minden and Halberstadt.

He skillfully took advantage of the alarm of the German Protestants after the Battle of White Mountain in 1620, to stipulate with Bremen's Chapter and Administrator John Frederick, Duke of Schleswig-Holstein-Gottorp, his cousin of second degree, to grant coadjutorship of the See of Bremen for his son Frederick, later crown prince of Denmark (September 1621). Coadjutorship usually included the succession of a See. A similar arrangement was reached in November for the Prince-Bishopric of Verden with its Chapter and Administrator Philip Sigismund. In 1623 Christian's son succeeded the late Philip Sigismund as Frederick II, Administrator of the Prince-Bishopric of Verden, only to flee the troops of the Catholic League under Count Johan 't Serclaes of Tilly in 1626.

In November 1619 Christian IV of Denmark, Duke of Holstein stationed Danish troops in the Bremian city of Stade, officially on behalf of his son the provided to be Administrator successor, suppressing an unrest of its burghers.

In 1620 Christian, the Younger, titular duke of Brunswick and Lunenburg-Wolfenbüttel, the Lutheran Administrator of the Prince-Bishopric Halberstadt requested that the Lutheran Prince-Archbishopric of Bremen would join the war coalition of the Protestant Union. The Administrator and the Estates of the Prince-Archbishopric met in a Diet and declared for their territory their loyalty to Ferdinand II, Holy Roman Emperor, and their neutrality in the conflict.

With Danish troops within his territory and Christian the Younger's request Administrator John Frederick tried desperately to keep his Prince-Archbishopric out of the war, being in complete agreement with the Estates and the city of Bremen. When in 1623 the Republic of the Seven United Netherlands, fighting in the Eighty Years' War for its independence against Habsburg's Spanish and imperial forces, requested its Calvinist co-religionist of the city of Bremen to join, the city refused, but started to enforce its fortifications.

In 1623 the territories comprising the Lower Saxon Circle decided to recruit an army in order to maintain an armed neutrality, with troops of the Catholic League already operating in the neighboured Lower Rhenish-Westphalian Circle and dangerously approaching their region. The concomitant effects of the war, debasements and dearness, had already caused an inflation also in the region. The population suffered from billeting and alimenting Baden-Durlachian, Danish, Halberstadtian, Leaguist, and Palatine troops, whose marching through the Prince-Archbishopric had to tolerate in order to prevent entering into armed conflict.

In 1623 the Republic of the Seven United Netherlands, diplomatically supported by James I, King of England and of Ireland and as James IV King of Scotland, the brother-in-law of Christian IV of Denmark, started a new anti-Habsburg campaign. Thus the troops of the Catholic League were bound and the Prince-Archbishopric seemed relieved. But soon after the imperial troops under Albrecht von Wallenstein headed for the North in an attempt to destroy the fading Hanseatic League, in order to subject the Hanseatic cities of Bremen, Hamburg and Lübeck and to establish a Baltic trade monopoly, to be run by some imperial favourites including Spaniards and Poles. The idea was to win Sweden's and Denmark's support, both of which since long were after the destruction of the Hanseatic League.

In May 1625 Christian IV of Denmark, Duke of Holstein was elected – in the latter of his functions – by the Lower Saxon Circle's member territories commander-in-chief of the Lower Saxon troops. More troops were recruited and to be billeted and alimented in the Lower Saxon territories, including the Prince-Archbishopric. In the same year Christian IV joined the Anglo-Dutch war coalition. In 1625 Tilly warned the Prince-Archbishop John Frederick to further accept the stationing of Danish troops and Ferdinand II, Holy Roman Emperor, demanded the immediate end of his and Verden's alliance with Denmark, with Verden being already ruled by Christian's son Frederick, being as well the provided successor of John Frederick. He declared again his loyalty to the Emperor and neutrality in the conflict. But all in vain.

Now Christian IV ordered his troops to capture all the important traffic hubs in the Prince-Archbishopric and entered into the Battle of Lutter am Barenberge, on 27 August 1626, where he was defeated by the Leaguist troops under Tilly. Christian IV and his surviving troops fled to the Prince-Archbishopric and took their headquarters in Stade. Administrator John Frederick, in personal union also Administrator of the Prince-Bishopric of Lübeck, fled to the latter and left the rule in the Prince-Archbishopric to the Chapter and the Estates.

In 1626 Tilly and his troops occupied the Prince-Bishopric of Verden, which caused a flight of Lutheran clergy from that territory. He demanded the Bremian Chapter to allow him to enter the Prince-Archbishopric. The Chapter, now holding the baby, declared again its loyalty to the Emperor and delayed an answer to the request, arguing that it had to consult with the Estates in a Diet first, which would be a lengthy procedure.

Meanwhile, Christian IV ordered Dutch, English and French troops for his support to land in the Prince-Archbishopric, while extorting from the latter high war contributions to finance his war. The Chapter's pleas for a reduction of the contributions Christian IV commented by arguing once the Leaguists would take over, his extortions will seem little.

By 1627 Christian IV had de facto dismissed his cousin John Frederick from the Bremian See. In the same year Christian IV withdrew from the Prince-Archbishopric, in order to fight Wallenstein's invasion of his Duchy of Holstein. Tilly then invaded the Prince-Archbishopric and captured its southern parts. The city of Bremen shut its city gates and entrenched behind its improved fortifications. In 1628 Tilly beleaguered Stade with its remaining garrison of 3,500 Danish and English soldiers. On 5 May 1628 Tilly granted them safe-conduct to England and Denmark and the whole Prince-Archbishopric was in his hands. Now Tilly turned to the city of Bremen, which paid him a ransom of 10,000 rixdollars in order to spare its siege. The city remained unoccupied.

Wallenstein had meanwhile conquered all the Jutish Peninsula, which made Christian IV to sign the Treaty of Lübeck, on 22 May 1629, in order to regain possession of all his feoffs on the peninsula, he in return agreed to formally end Denmark's participation in the Thirty Years' War and waived for his son Frederick II, Administrator of the Prince-Bishopric of Verden, the administration of that prince-bishopric as well as the provided succession as Administrator of the Prince-Bishopric of Halberstadt.

Administrator John Frederick, exiled in the Imperial Free City of Lübeck, was in a markedly weak position. So in 1628 he consented that the Lutheran convent in the former Roman Catholic St. Mary's monastery in Stade – under Leaguist occupation – was restituted to Catholic rite and manned with foreign monks, if the Chapter would also agree. Again passing the buck on to the Chapter.

The Leaguist takeover enabled Ferdinand II, Holy Roman Emperor, to implement the Edict of Restitution, decreed on 6 March 1629 within the Prince-Archbishopric of Bremen and the Prince-Bishopric of Verden. The Bremian monasteries still maintaining Roman Catholic rite – Altkloster Convent, Harsefeld Archabbey, Neukloster, and Zeven – became the local strongholds for a reCatholicisation within the scope of Counter-Reformation.

Under the threat of the Edict of Restitution John Frederick consented to Canonical Visitations of the remaining monasteries, those clinging to Roman Catholic rite and those converted to voluntary Lutheran convents alike. Nunneries had traditionally been institutions to provide unmarried daughters of the better off, who couldn't be provided a husband befitting their social status or who didn't want to marry, with a decent livelihood. So when an unmarried woman of that status joined a nunnery she would bestow earning assets (real estate) or – restricted to her lifetime – regular revenues paid by her male relatives, on the monastery, making up in the former case part of the nunnery's estates (not to be confused with the political body of the Estates).

In many territories, where the majority of the population adopted Lutheranism, the nunneries' function to provide sustenance for unmarried women wasn't to be given up. So it happened that the Prince-Archbishopric's former Roman Catholic nunneries of Himmelpforten, Lilienthal, Neuenwalde, and Osterholz with all their estates had turned into such Lutheran women's convents (German: das Stift, more particular: Damenstift, literally ladies' foundation), while the nunnery of Zeven was in the process of becoming one, with – among a majority of Catholic nuns – a number of nuns of Lutheran denomination, usually called conventuals. Other expressions like abbess, for the chairwoman, and prioress for conventuals of certain hierarchic function, were – and are partly – continued to be used in such Lutheran Stifte.

Within the scope of the visitations by the end of the year 1629 the Roman Catholic visitators issued an ultimatum to the Lutheran conventuals had been thrown out from the monasteries, with the estates of Himmelpforten and Neuenwalde then being bestowed to the Jesuites, in order to finance them and their missioning in the course of the Counter-Reformation in the Prince-Archbishopric. The expelled conventuals were denied to get the real estate restituted, which they bestowed on the monastery, when they entered it.

Ferdinand II suspended the capitulars from penalty, if they would dismiss the Lutheran coadjutor Frederick, later Crown Prince of Denmark from office. The Chapter refused, still backing Frederick, whom it had elected with full legal validity in 1621. So Ferdinand II himself dismissed him by way of using the Edict of Restitution, in favour of his youngest son, the Roman Catholic Archduke Leopold Wilhelm of Austria, already administrator of the prince-bishoprics of Halberstadt (1628–1648), Passau (1625–1662) and Strasbourg (1626–1662).

Ferdinand II left John Frederick in office, against Leaguist resistance, for he had always kept loyalty to him. The Catholic League wished the Roman Catholic Count Francis William of Wartenberg, Prince-Bishopric of Osnabrück (1625–1634 and again 1648–1661), onto the See. After all, the See included at those years an annual revenue of 60,000 rixdollars at the free disposal of its holder, making up half the Prince-Archbishopric's budget.

Francis of Wartenberg, appointed by Ferdinand II as chairman of the imperial restitution commission, carrying out the provisions of the Edict of Restitution in the Lower Saxon Circle, dismissed John Frederick in 1629, who acquiesced.

In September 1629 the Chapter was ordered to render an account of all the capitular and prince-archiepiscopal estates (not to be confused with the Estates), which it refused, arguing first that the order was not authenticated and later that due to disputes with the city council of Bremen, they couldn't freely travel to render an account let alone do the necessary research on the estates. The anti-Catholic attitudes of the burghers and the council of Bremen would make it completely impossible to prepare the restitution of estates from the Lutheran Chapter to the Roman Catholic Church. Even Lutheran capitulars were uneasy in Calvinistic Bremen. In October 1629 the capitular secretary finally rendered the ordered account in Verden and was informed that by the Edict of Restitution the Chapter is regarded to be illegitimate. Lutheran capitulars were interrogated, but the Chapter was left in office, with its decisions subjected to the consent of the restitution commission. Pope Urban VIII appointed additional Roman Catholic capitulars in 1630, including a new provost.

The estates within the boundaries of the unoccupied city of Bremen weren't restituted by order of the city council. The council argued, that the city had long been Protestant, but the restitution commission argued that the city was de jure a part of the Prince-Archbishopric, so Protestantism had illegitimately alienated estates from the Roman Catholic Church. The city council answered under these circumstances it would rather separate from the Holy Roman Empire and join the quasi-independent Republic of the Seven Netherlands (Its independence was finally confirmed by the Treaty of Westphalia in 1648). The city was neither to be conquered nor to be successfully beleaguered due to its new fortifications and its access to the North Sea via the Weser river.

Within the occupied Prince-Archbishopric the Leaguist occupants carried out the restitution. In Stade, Tilly's headquarters, all churches, except of St. Nicholas, were handed over to foreign Catholic clerics. But the burghers didn't attend Catholic services. So in March 1630 Tilly expelled all Lutheran clergy, except the one of St. Nicholas. Tilly levied high war contributions from Stade's burghers (e.g. 22,533 rixdollars in 1628 alone) and offered in 1630 to relieve every burgher, who would attend Catholic services, without success. In July 1630 Tilly left to head for the Duchy of Pomerania, where King Gustavus II Adolphus of Sweden had landed with his troops, opening a new front in the Thirty Years' War. He had been won by French diplomacy to join a new anti-imperial coalition, soon joined by the Netherlands.

In February 1631 John Frederick conferred with Gustavus II Adolphus and a number of Lower Saxon princes in Leipzig, all of them troubled by Habsburg's growing influence wielded by virtue of the Edict of Restitution in a number of Northern German Lutheran prince-bishoprics. John Frederick speculated to regain the Prince-Archbishopric of Bremen and therefore in June/July 1631 officially allied himself with Sweden. For the war being John Frederick accepted the supreme command of Gustavus II Adolphus, who promised to restitute the Prince-Archbishopric to its former Administrator. In October an Army, newly recruited by John Frederick, started to reconquer the Prince-Archbishopric and – supported by Swedish troops – to capture the neighboured Prince-Bishopric of Verden, de facto dismissing Verden's Catholic Prince-Bishop Count Francis of Wartenberg (ruled 1630-1631), and causing the flight of the Catholic clergy wherever they arrived. The Prince-Bishopric of Verden became subject of a Swedish military administration, while John Frederick ascended its See in 1631.

The reconquest of the Prince-Archbishopric – helped by forces from Sweden and from the city of Bremen – was interrupted by Leaguist forces under Gottfried Heinrich Graf zu Pappenheim, coming as a relief to Stade, where they joined the Catholic imperial and Leaguist forces still holding out. On 10 May 1632 they were granted safe-conduct and left a desperately impoverished city of Stade after its siege by John Frederick's forces. John Frederick was back in his office, only to realise the supremacy of Sweden, insisting on its supreme command until the war's end. The Prince-Archbishopric continuously suffered from billeting and alimenting soldiers. The relation between the Estates, who had to maintain administration under Catholic occupation, and the returned Administrator were difficult. The Estates preferred to directly negotiate with the occupants, this time the Swedes. John Frederick wanted to secularise the monasteries in favour of his budget, but the opposing Estates prevented that.

After John Frederick's death in 1634 Chapter and Estates regarded Frederick's (later Danish Crown Prince) dismissal as coadjutor by Ferdinand II by virtue of the Edict of Restitution illegitimate. But the Swedish occupants had to be persuaded first, to accept Frederick's succession. So Chapter and Estates ruled the Prince-Archbishopric until the conclusion of the negotiations with Sweden. In 1635 he succeeded as Lutheran Administrator Frederick II in the Sees of Bremen and of Verden. But he had to render homage to the minor Queen Christina of Sweden.

In the same year Pope Urban VIII provided the Catholic coadjutor Leopold Wilhelm, Archduke of Austria, imposed in 1629 by his father Ferdinand II, with the Archdiocese of Bremen, but due to its persisting occupation by the Swedes he never gained de facto pastoral influence let alone the power as administrator of the prince-archbishopric.

In 1635/1636 the Estates and Frederick II agreed with Sweden upon the prince-archbishopric's neutrality. But this didn't last long, because in the Danish-Swedish Torstenson War (1643–45) the Swedes seized de facto rule in both prince-bishoprics. Christian IV of Denmark had to sign the Second Peace of Brömsebro on 13 August 1645, a number of Danish territories, including the two prince-bishoprics, being ceded into Swedish hands. So Frederick II had to resign as Administrator in both prince-bishoprics. He succeeded his late father on the Danish throne as Frederick III of Denmark in 1648.

With Bremen sede vacante again, the new Pope Innocent X appointed Count Francis of Wartenberg, the expelled short-period Prince-Bishop of Verden (1630–1631) and officiating Prince-Bishop of Osnabrück (1625–1661), as Vicar Apostolic in 1645, i.e. provisional head of the See. Wartenberg never gained pastoral influence, let alone power as prince-bishop due to the persisting Swedish occupation of the Prince-Archbishopric until the end of the Thirty Years' War.

With the impending enfeoffment of the Prince-Archbisporic of Bremen to the political Great Power of Sweden, as under negotiation for the Treaty of Westphalia, the city of Bremen searched for an imperial confirmation of its status of imperial immediacy from 1186 (Gelnhausen Privilege), which Ferdinand III, Holy Roman Emperor, granted to the city in 1646 (Diploma of Linz).

=== The further History of the Prince-Archbishopric after 1648 ===
For the further history see the article about the collectively ruled Duchy of Bremen and Principality of Verden (1648–1823). Then see Stade Region (1823–1978), which emerged by the establishment of the High-Bailiwick of Stade in 1823, comprising the territories of the former Duchies of Bremen and Verden and the Land Hadeln.

==== Reorganisation of Roman Catholic Church in the former Territory of the Archdiocese and Prince-Archbishopric of Bremen ====
In 1824 Bremen's former diocesan territory was distributed among the still-existing neighbouring dioceses of Osnabrück, Münster and Hildesheim, the latter of which covers today the former territory of the Prince-Archbishopric proper. Except for the prevailingly Calvinist Free Hanseatic City of Bremen and its territory, which continued to be supervised by the Roman Catholic Vicariate Apostolic of the Nordic Missions. The Free Hanseatic City of Bremen became part of the Diocese of Osnabrück only in 1929, with the Vicariate Apostolic being dismantled in the same year.

== Incumbents of the see ==
See: List of administrators, archbishops, bishops, and prince-archbishops of Bremen

== Monasteries in the territory of the prince-archbishopric ==
1. Altkloster: Benedictine Old Nunnery of Ss. Mary's and Lawrence, existed from 1197 to 1648, subject to the Diocese of Verden
2. Bremen: Dominican St. Catherine's Friary, Bremen, existed from 1225 to 1528, subject to Bremen Archdiocese
3. Bremen: Franciscan St. John's Friary, existed from 1225 to 1528, subject to Bremen Archdiocese
4. Bremen: Benedictine St. Paul's Friary, existed from 1050 to 1523, subject to Bremen Archdiocese
5. Harsefeld: Benedictine Archabbey of monks, existed from 1104 to 1648, exempt
6. Hemmingstedt: Benedictine St. Mary's Nunnery, existed from 1502 to 1537, subject to Bremen Archdiocese, Hamburg subchapter; after 1526 not part of the secular prince-archiepiscopal rule any more
7. Himmelpforten: Cistercian Porta Coeli Nunnery, existed from before 1255 to 1647, subject to Bremen Archdiocese
8. Lilienthal: Cistercian St. Mary's Nunnery in the Valley of Lilies, existed from 1232 to 1646, subject to Bremen Archdiocese
9. Lunden: Franciscan Friary, existed from 1517 to 1536, subject to Bremen Archdiocese, Hamburg subchapter; after 1526 not part of the secular prince-archiepiscopal rule any more
10. Meldorf: Dominican Marienau Friary, existed from 1380 to 1540, subject to Bremen Archdiocese, Hamburg subchapter; after 1526 not part of the secular prince-archiepiscopal rule any more
11. Neuenwalde: Benedictine Convent of the Holy Cross, exists since 1219, till 1648 subject to Bremen Archdiocese
12. Neukloster: Benedictine New Nunnery, existed from the 1270s to 1647, subject to Verden Diocese
13. Osterholz: Benedictine Nunnery in the Osterholz, existed from 1182 to 1650, subject to Bremen Archdiocese
14. Stade: Benedictine Our Lady's Friary, existed from 1141 to 1648, subject to Bremen Archdiocese
15. Stade: Franciscan St. John's Friary, existed from the 13th to the 16th century, subject to Bremen Archdiocese
16. Stade: Premonstratensian St. George's Friary, existed from 1132 to about 1527, subject to Bremen Archdiocese
17. Zeven: Benedictine Zeven Nunnery, existed from before 986 to 1650, subject to Bremen Archdiocese

== Notable people from the Archdiocese and Prince-Archbishopric of Bremen ==
A list of interesting people whose birth, death, residence or activity took place in the Archdiocese or Prince-Archbishopric of Bremen. Not included are persons mentioned above in the list of incumbents of the see.

- Adam of Bremen (before 1050 - c. 1081), Roman Catholic canon and historiographer
- Albert of Bexhövede (c. 1165–1229), Roman Catholic Bishop of Riga and Terra Mariana, seated in Riga, which he founded in 1201
- Albert of Stade (c. 1187 - after 1265), abbot of Stade's monastery of St. Mary and chronicler
- Bonaventura Borchgreving (died latest 1596), upper Kapellmeister at the court in Copenhagen
- Johann Bornemacher (died 1526), Roman Catholic, then Lutheran theologist, martyr
- Gertrud von dem Brake (died second half of 15th century), Roman Catholic Prioress of Neukloster
- Emma of Lesum (also Imma von Stiepel; c. 975-980 – 1038), benefactor of the Roman Catholic Church, Roman Catholic saint
- Augustin van Getelen (end of 15th century – 1556), Roman Catholic Dominican, controversial theologist in København
- Gerhard Halepaghe (c. 1430–1485), Roman Catholic priest, church and monastic reformer
- Christoph von Issendorff (1529–1586), Lutheran heritable Cup-bearer of the Prince-Archbishopric, Burgmann of Vörde
- Henry of Zutphen, (1488–1524), Roman Catholic Augustine monk, later Protestant Reformator in the city of Bremen

== See also ==
- Duchy of Bremen
- Stade Region
- Elbe-Weser Triangle
