= Dörverden =

- Municipality
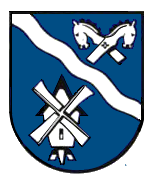
- Coat of arms

- Location of Dörverden within Verden district
- Interactive map of Dörverden
- Location within Germany Location within Lower Saxony
- Coordinates: 52°51′N 9°14′E
- Country: Germany
- State: Lower Saxony
- District: Verden
- Subdivisions: 10 Ortsteile

Government
  - Mayor (2021–26): Alexander von Segger (Ind.)

Area
  - Total: 83.51 km^{2} (32.24 sq mi)
- Elevation: 16 m (52 ft)

Population (2025-12-31)
  - Total: 8,584
  - Density: 102.8/km^{2} (266.2/sq mi)
- Time zone: UTC+01:00 (CET)
  - Summer (DST): UTC+02:00 (CEST)
- Postal codes: 27313
- Dialling codes: 04234
- Vehicle registration: VER
- Website: www.doerverden.de

Dörverden (German pronunciation: [ˈdœʁfɛʁdn̩]; Low German: Dörbern, Dörb'n or Dörveern) is a municipality in the district of Verden, in Lower Saxony, Germany. It is situated on the right bank of the Weser, approx. 8 km south of Verden, and 40 km southeast of Bremen.

Dörverden belonged to the Prince-Bishopric of Verden, established in 1180. In 1648 the Prince-Bishopric was transformed into the Principality of Verden, which was first ruled in personal union by the Swedish Crown – interrupted by a Danish occupation (1712–1715) – and from 1715 on by the Hanoverian Crown. In 1807 the short-lived Kingdom of Westphalia annexed the principality before France annexed it in 1810. In 1813 the principality was restored to the Electorate of Hanover, which – after its upgrade to the Kingdom of Hanover in 1814 – incorporated the principality in a real union and the princely territory, including Dörverden, became part of the new Stade Region, established in 1823.
