= Tanco =

Medieval Scottish saint

Saint Tanco
- Born: Scotland
- Died: 815; Verden, Saxony, Carolingian Empire
- Venerated in: Catholic Church; Eastern Orthodox Church
- Feast: 6 February or 15 February

Saint Tanco (or Tancho, Tanchon, Tatta, etc.; died 815 AD) was a Scottish abbot, bishop, and martyr in what is now Germany. He is venerated as a saint in the Eastern Orthodox Church and Roman Catholic Church, with his feast day on 6 February or 15 February depending on the liturgical calendar.

== Monks of Ramsgate account ==
The monks of St Augustine's Abbey, Ramsgate, wrote in their Book of Saints (1921),

Tanchon (Tancho) (St.) M. (Feb. 15)
(7th or 8th century) An Irish missionary to Pagan Germany. He spread the knowledge of the Gospel more especially in Saxony. He became the third Bishop of Werden, and in the end suffered martyrdom.

== Butler's account ==
The hagiographer Alban Butler ( 1710–1773) wrote in his Lives of the Primitive Fathers, Martyrs, and Other Principal Saints, under February 16,

St. TANCO, or TATTA, B. M.
Patton, abbot of Amabaric, in Scotland, passing into Germany to preach the gospel, and being chosen bishop of Verden, Tanco, who had served God many years in that abbey in great reputation for his singular learning and piety, was raised to the dignity of abbot. Out of an ardent thirst after martyrdom, he resigned this charge, and followed his countryman and predecessor into Germany, where, after some time, he succeeded him in the see of Verden, of which he was the third bishop. His success in propagating the faith was exceedingly great, but it was to him a subject of inexpressible grief to see many who professed themselves Christians, live enslaved to shameful passions. In order to convert, or at least to confound them, he preached a most zealous sermon against the vices which reigned amongst them; at which a barbarous mob was so enraged as fiercely to assault him; and one of them, stabbing him with a lance, procured him the glorious crown of martyrdom about the year 815. This account of him is given us by Krantzius, (1. 1. Metrop. c. 22. & 29.) Lesley, l. 5. Hist. Wion, l. 3. Ligni Vitæ.

== Ranbeck's account ==
Aegedius Ranbeck wrote in his Saints of the Order of Saint Benedict (1896),

Saint Tanco, Bishop of Werda and Martyr

Among the noble band of missionaries and martyrs whom Scotland sent forth to spread the light of the Faith among the heathen nations of Germany and Gaul, we must celebrate Saint Tanco. Though the son of noble and wealthy parents, he at an early age entered the Monastery of Amarbarcum, and there, by his unremitting toil, his devotion to prayer, his fasts and watchings, his gentleness towards others while most rigorous to himself, he so gained the love and respect of all, that on the death of the Abbot he was unanimously chosen by the Community to be their head. His elevation brought no change in his manner of living. In his own person he set his brethren a perfect example of how to live up to the Rule of Saint Benedict; yet he tempered his severity with such gentleness that all his orders were executed by his monks with the greatest readiness.

Our Saint’s soul, however, longed for a wider field. The example of Columba and Gall and countless other Saints incited him to undertake a campaign against the false gods still worshipped in many parts of Germany. Communicating his intention to his monks, he selected from among them a band of comrades, and proceeded to the country of the Saxons. There, visiting all the villages and towns, he kept sowing the good seed; but the harvest did not answer to his expectations. The savage and ignorant pagans openly mocked the devoted missionaries; so our Saint, leaving some of his companions to look after the few converts he had made, next went to Flanders. In this country, and in the territories adjoining it, his labours were most successful, numbers joining the Church.

Saint Tanco’s name was now celebrated throughout Flanders and Gaul; his fame penetrated even to the royal palace. The inhabitants of Werda as yet were very ignorant of the blessings of Christianity; moreover, they were sunk in the most loathsome vice and wickedness. In his zeal for the Faith, the Emperor Charlemagne sent for Saint Tanco, and asked him to take charge of the See of Werda, then vacant. Our Saint consented; but the task was no easy one. In his diocese idols were still openly worshipped, and the most terrible crimes were of daily occurrence. On foot, at the head of the monks whom he had brought with him from his native land, the Bishop went from village to village, encouraging the faint-hearted, denouncing the guilty, and performing miracles to convince unbelievers. Yet his descriptions of the happiness that awaits the pious and of the punishment in store for the wicked were treated as old wives’ tales. Finding his words of no avail, he attacked their idols wherever he found them; he smashed the statues of the false gods, overthrew their altars, and levelled their temples to the ground. At this the fierce barbarians became so enraged, that they beat out their Bishop’s brains with clubs, cut off his legs and arms with their swords, and left the trunk, pierced with a thousand wounds, swimming in its gore, A.D. 815.

== Sources ==
- Butler, Alban (1798), The Lives of the Primitive Fathers, Martyrs, and Other Principal Saints, J. Moir This article incorporates text from this source, which is in the public domain.
- Ranbeck, Father Aegedius, O.S.B (1896), Father J. Alphonsus Morrall, O.S.B. (ed.), Saints of the Order of Saint Benedict, January, February, March, translated by J P Molohan, M.A., London, England – via CatholicSaints.info This article incorporates text from this source, which is in the public domain.
- St. Augustine's Abbey, Ramsgate (1921), The Book of saints : a dictionary of servants of God canonized by the Catholic Church, London: A. & C. Black, ltd. This article incorporates text from this source, which is in the public domain.
