= Hochstift =

Territory of the Holy Roman Empire

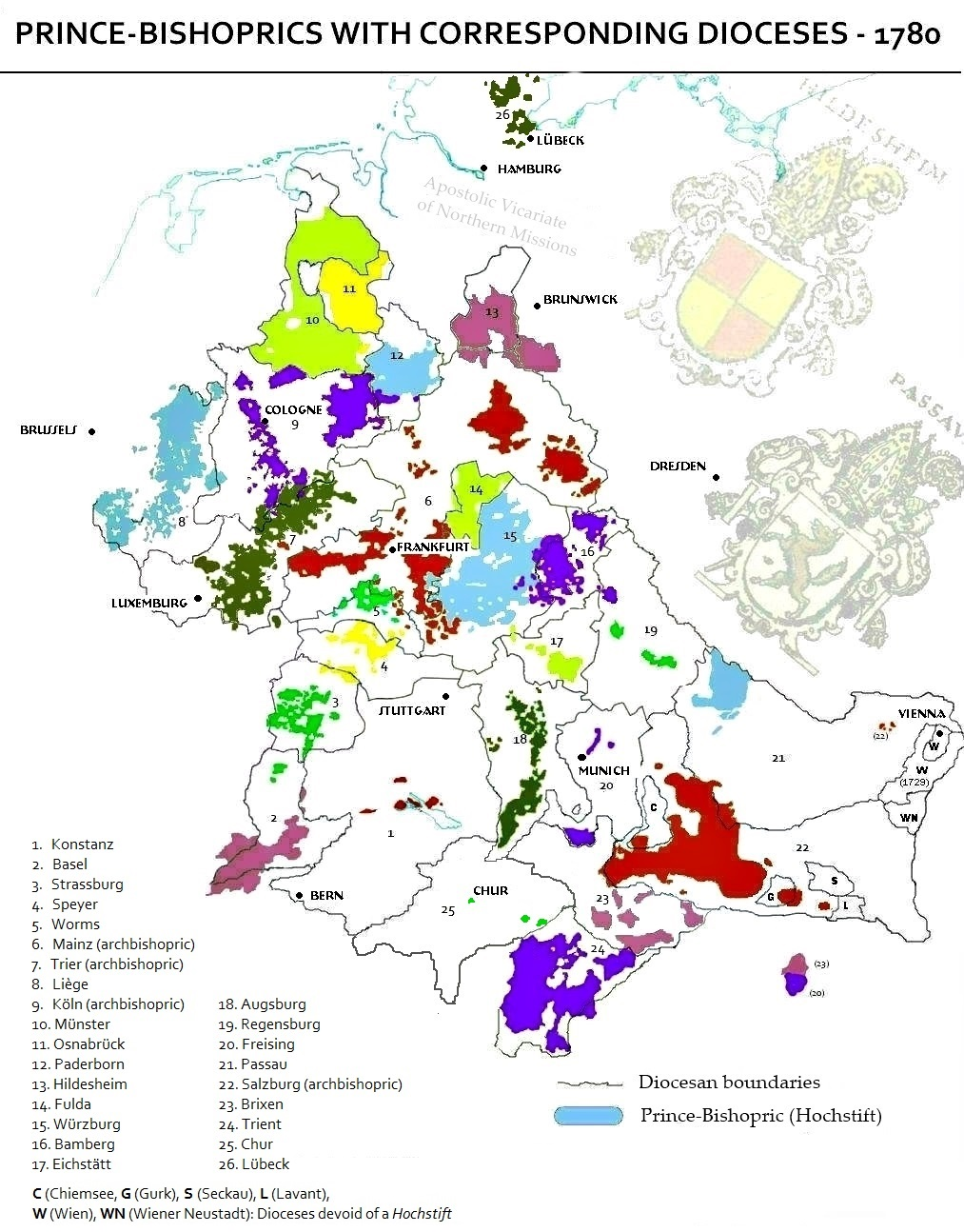
Hochstifte and dioceses in the late 18th century

In the Holy Roman Empire, the German term Hochstift (plural: Hochstifte) referred to the territory ruled by a bishop as a prince (i.e. prince-bishop). In contrast a bishop's diocese is generally much larger and only ruled via spiritual authority. The terms prince-bishopric (Fürstbistum, or simply Bistum) and ecclesiastical principality are synonymous with Hochstift. Erzstift and Kurerzstift referred respectively to the territory (prince-archbishopric) ruled by a prince-archbishop and an elector-archbishop while Stift referred to the territory ruled by an imperial abbot or abbess, or a princely abbot or abbess. Stift was also often used to refer to any type of ecclesiastical principality.

== Names ==
Das Stift [plural: die Stifte or, in some regions, die Stifter]/het sticht [in Dutch] (literally, the "donation"), denotes in its original meaning the donated or else acquired fund of estates whose revenues are taken to maintain a college and the pertaining church (Stiftskirche, i.e. collegiate church) and its collegiate canons (Stiftsherr[en]) or canonesses (Stiftsfrau[en]). If the Stift as a fund served to maintain the specific college of a cathedral (a so-called cathedral chapter) then the Stift was often called das Domstift (i.e. cathedral donation [fund]).

Hochstift is a compound with hoch ("high") used for a prince-bishopric, meaning literally a "high [ranking ecclesiastical] donation [fund of estates]". Whereas Erzstift, a compound with Erz… ("arch[i]…"), was the corresponding expression for a prince-archbishopric. For the three prince-electorates of Cologne (Kurköln), Mainz (Kurmainz) and Trier (Kurtrier), which were simultaneously archbishoprics the corresponding term is Kurerzstift (electorate-archbishopric). The adjective pertaining to Stift as a territory is stiftisch (of, pertaining to a prince-bishopric; prince-episcopal). As a compound, the term Stift today usually takes the copulative "s" when used as a preceding compound, such as in Stiftsadel (vassal nobility of a prince-bishopric), Stiftsamtmann (=official of a Stift), Stiftsmann (plural: Stiftsleute; =vassal tenant of an estate of a Stift), Stiftssasse (=subject/inhabitant of a prince-bishopric), Stiftsstände (=estates of a prince-bishopric as a realm), or Stiftstag (diet of the estates of a prince-bishopric).

Specific prince-bishoprics were often called Hochstift/Erzstift X, as in Hochstift Augsburg or in Erzstift Bremen, with stiftbremisch meaning of/pertaining to the Prince-Archbishopric of Bremen, as opposed to stadtbremisch (of/pertaining to the city of Bremen). By contrast, the spiritual entities, the dioceses, are called Bistum ("diocese") or Erzbistum ("archdiocese") in German. The difference between a Hochstift/Erzstift and a Bistum/Erzbistum is not always clear to authors so that non-scholarly texts often translate Hochstift or Erzstift incorrectly simply as diocese/bishopric or archdiocese/archbishopric, respectively.

== History ==
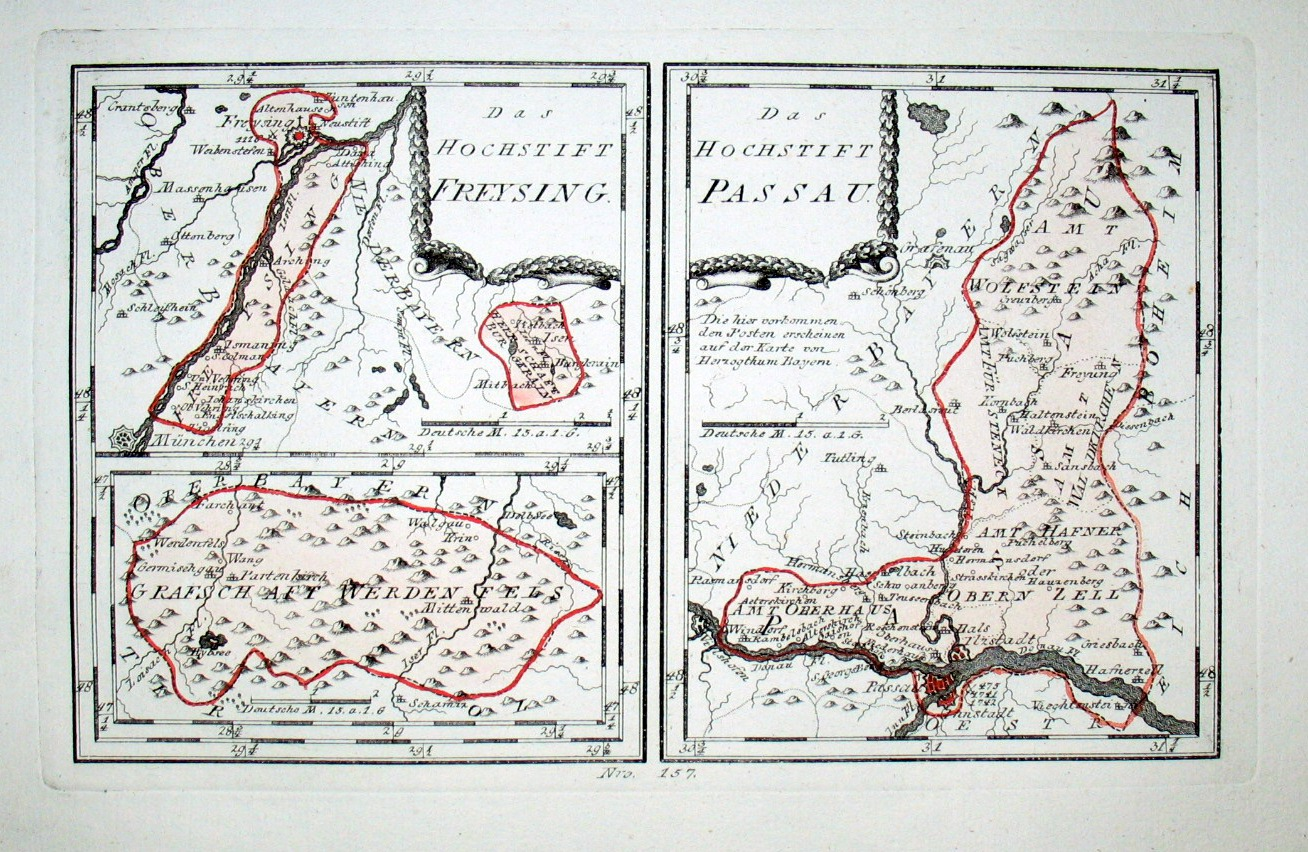
The prince-bishoprics (Hochstifte) of Freising and Passau in the late 18th century

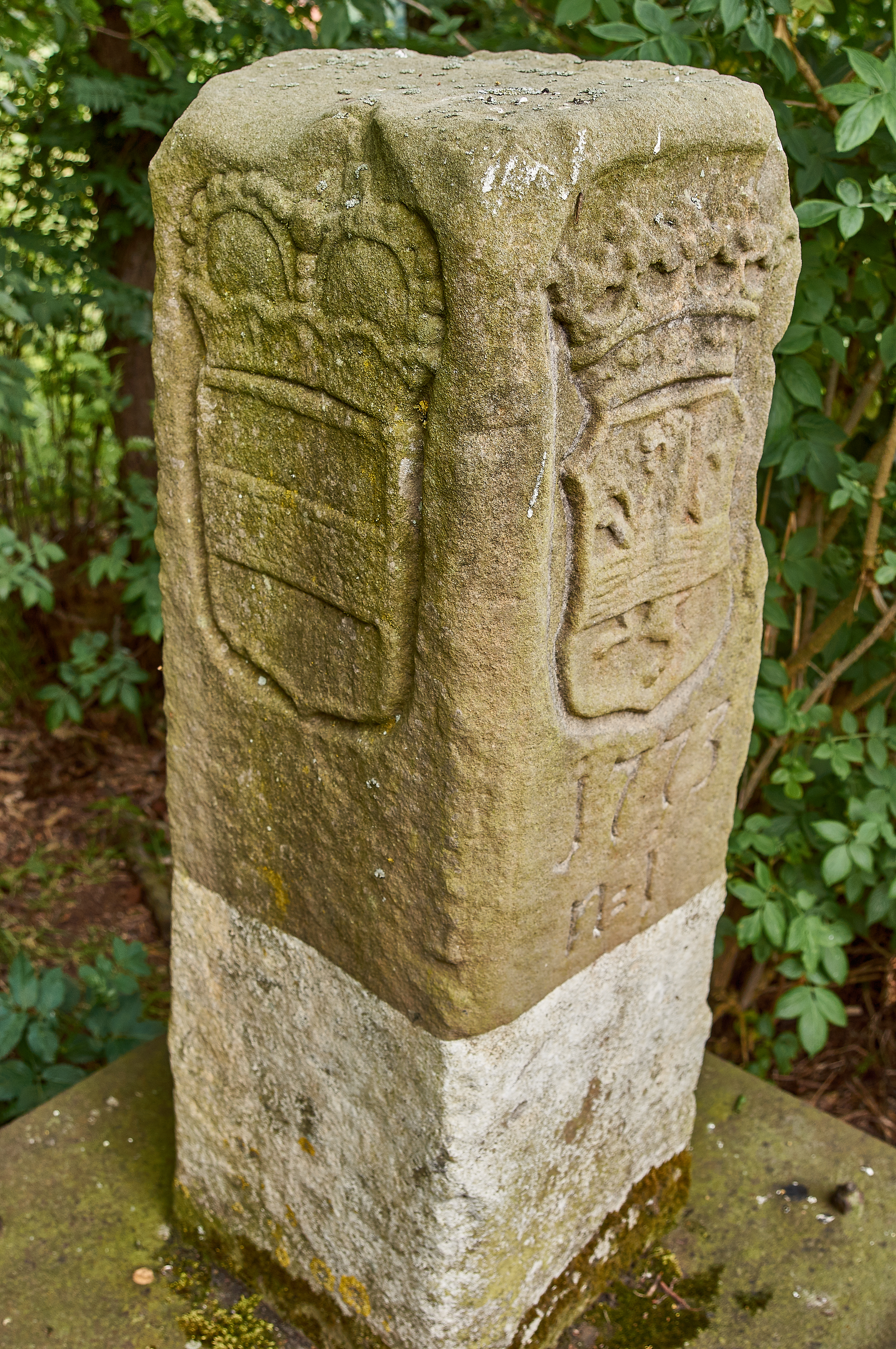
Stone marker from 1766 demarcating the territories of the Prince-Bishopric of Münster (coat of arms on the left side) and the Dutch province of Overijssel

The Hochstift was made of land mostly acquired in the Middle Ages through donations by the king/emperor, bequests by local lords or through purchase. It was often made of non-contiguous parts, some of which could be located outside the bishop's diocese. While a diocese is a spiritual territorial jurisdiction, a prince-bishopric or Hochstift was a secular territorial jurisdiction, a fiefdom created and granted by the Holy Roman Emperor. Exercising a double function, an ecclesiastical and a secular one, the prince-bishops were thus subject to two different legal bases and two jurisdictions. The relationship between the two functions was governed in part by the Concordat of Worms of 1122. A number of Hochstifte were established in 1180 in the wake of the partial dismantling of the Duchy of Saxony.

The prince-bishop, elected by the canons of the cathedral chapter and often belonging to the high nobility, typically enjoyed imperial immediacy; he wielded the same authority over his principality as any secular prince, such as a duke or a margrave, over his. He had seat and vote at the Imperial Diet.

From a high of more than 40 in the late Middle Ages, the number of Hochstifte (including archbishoprics) was down to 26 by the late 18th century. None was created for nearly four centuries, between the Golden Bull of 1356 and the conversion of the Princely Abbey of Fulda to a bishopric in 1752. All remaining Hochstifte were secularized during the Napoleonic Wars in the early years of the 19th century, and none remained at the time of the dissolution of the Holy Roman Empire in 1806, except Breslau whose residual territorial authority was abolished by Prussia in 1810.

== List of Hochstiften ==
The starting dates indicated below are for the first documented acquisition of territorial authority, which is often significantly later than the establishment of the bishopric itself.

=== Prince-Archbishoprics ===
- Electoral Prince-Archbishopric of Trier (German: Kurtrier), 898–1801, Catholic
- Electoral Prince-Archbishopric of Cologne (German: Kurköln), 954–1803, Catholic except during the 1580s Cologne War
- Electoral Prince-Archbishopric of Mainz (German: Kurmainz), 982–1803, Catholic
- Prince-Archbishopric of Bremen, 1180–1648, Catholic until 1566, then under Lutheran administration and secularized in 1648 as the Duchy of Bremen
- Prince-Archbishopric of Magdeburg, 1180–1648, Catholic until 1566, then under Lutheran administration and secularized in 1648 as the Duchy of Magdeburg within Brandenburg-Prussia
- Prince-Archbishopric of Besançon, 1184–1803, Catholic; territory lost to France in 1678 by the Treaties of Nijmegen
- Prince-Archbishopric of Salzburg, 1278–1803, Catholic; secularized as the Electorate of Salzburg
- Prince-Bishopric of Cambrai, 1007–1802, Catholic; raised to Archbishopric in 1559, lost to France in 1678 by the Treaties of Nijmegen

=== Prince-Bishoprics ===
- Prince-Bishopric of Speyer, 7C-1803
- Prince-Bishopric of Strasbourg, 775–1803
- Prince-Bishopric of Brescia, 844–1133
- Prince-Bishopric of Worms, 861–1802
- Prince-Bishopric of Augsburg, 888–1803
- Prince-Bishopric of Metz, 945–1648
- Prince-Bishopric of Chur, 958–1798
- Prince-Bishopric of Zeitz then Naumburg, 968–1564
- Prince-Bishopric of Liège, 972–1795
- Prince-Bishopric of Verdun, 997–1648
- Prince-Bishopric of Passau, 999–1803
- Prince-Bishopric of Sion, 999–1648
- Prince-Bishopric of Merseburg, 1004–1565
- Prince-Bishopric of Trent, 1004–1803
- Prince-Bishopric of Utrecht, 1024–1528
- Prince-Bishopric of Brixen, 1027–1803
- Prince-Bishopric of Basel, 1032–1803
- Prince-Bishopric of Toul, 1048–1648
- Prince-Bishopric of Münster, 1122–1802
- Prince-Bishopric of Havelberg, 1144–1571
- Prince-Bishopric of Geneva, 1154–1535
- Prince-Bishopric of Constance, 1155–1803
- Prince-Bishopric of Brandenburg, 1165–1569
- Prince-Bishopric of Würzburg, 1168–1803
- Prince-Bishopric of Schwerin, 1171–1648
- Prince-Bishopric of Halberstadt, 1180–1648
- Prince-Bishopric of Lübeck, 1180–1803
- Prince-Bishopric of Meissen, 1180–1666
- Prince-Bishopric of Minden, 1180–1648
- Prince-Bishopric of Verden, 1180–1648
- Prince-Bishopric of Breslau, 1198–1810
- Prince-Bishopric of Freising, 1220–1802
- Prince-Bishopric of Osnabrück, 1226–1803
- Prince-Bishopric of Hildesheim, 1235–1803
- Prince-Bishopric of Ratzeburg, 1236–1648
- Prince-Bishopric of Bamberg, ca. 1242–1802
- Prince-Bishopric of Cammin, 1248–1650
- Prince-Bishopric of Lausanne, 1270–1536
- Prince-Bishopric of Regensburg, 13C-1803
- Prince-Bishopric of Paderborn, 1281–1802
- Prince-Bishopric of Eichstätt, 1305–1802
- Prince-Bishopric of Fulda, 1752–1803
- Prince-Bishopric of Corvey, 1792–1803

Some Austrian and Bavarian bishoprics such as Chiemsee, Gurk, Lavant and Seckau had no territorial authority and are therefore not included in the list, even though they participated in Imperial diets.

== See also ==
- Ecclesiastical fief
- Ecclesiastical principalities in Terra Mariana: Archbishopric of Riga, Bishopric of Courland, Bishopric of Dorpat, and Bishopric of Ösel–Wiek
- List of states in the Holy Roman Empire
- Patriarchal State of Aquileia
- Prince-Bishopric of Montenegro
- Prince-Bishopric of Warmia
- Princely abbeys and imperial abbeys of the Holy Roman Empire
