= Prince-Bishopric of Verden =

Prince-Bishopric within the Holy Roman Empire

Prince-Bishopric of Verden Principality of Verden (Hoch)Stift Verden (1180–1648)
- 1180–1648
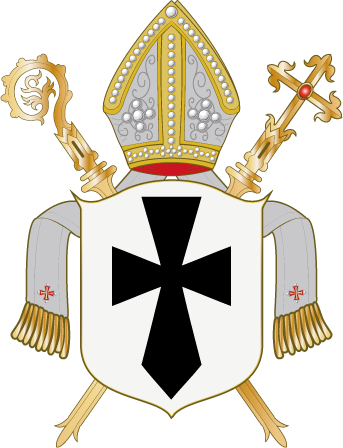
- Coat of arms

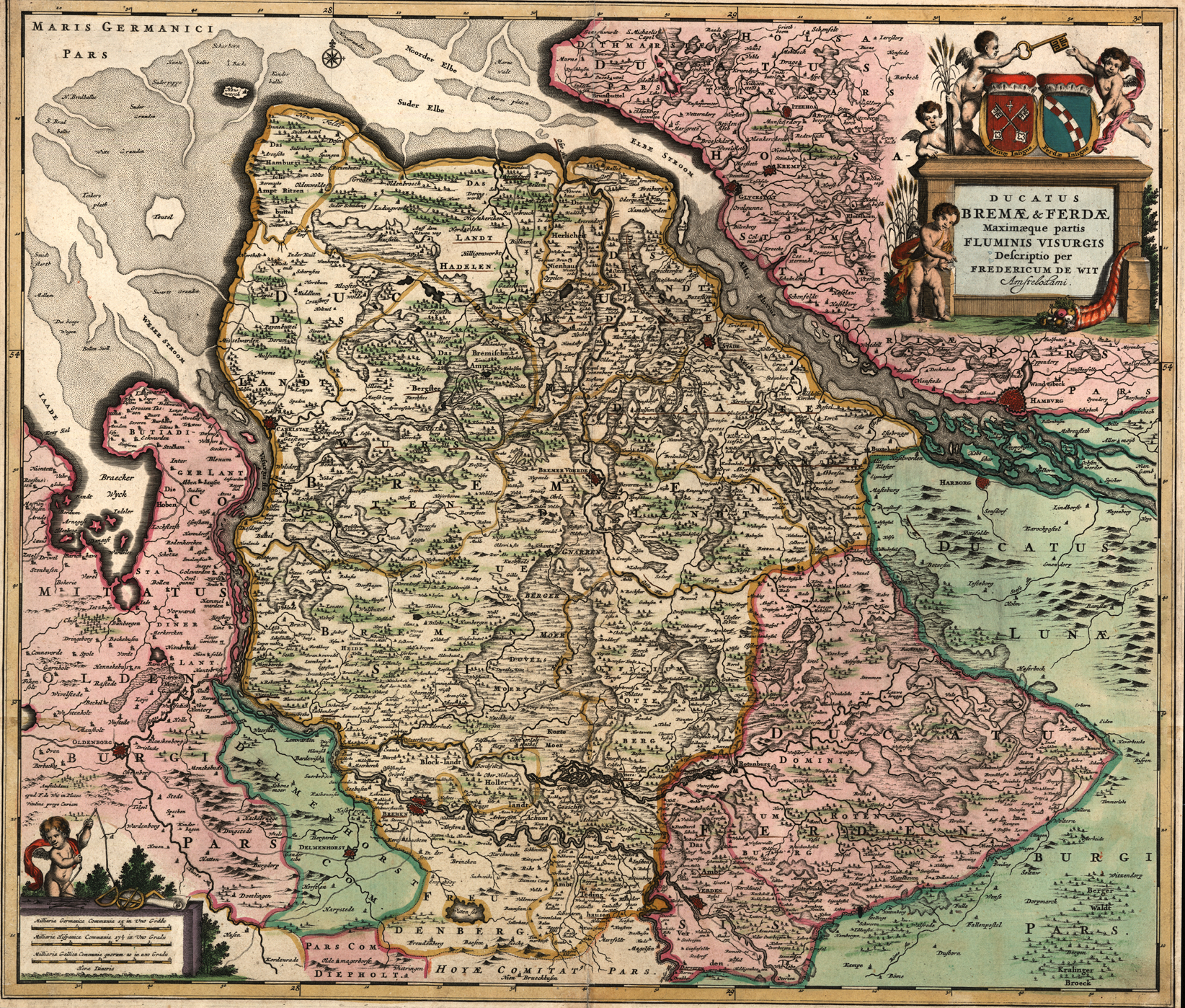
- Verden (in pink, below right) c. 1655
- Status: State of the Holy Roman Empire
- Capital: Verden (seat of chapter), Rotenburg (residence of pr.-bishops since 1195)¹
- Common languages: German, Low German
- Religion: Catholic Church till the 1550s, then Lutheranism
- Government: Ecclesiastical principality
- Ruler
  - 1395–1398: Prince-Bishop Dietrich
  - 1398–1399: Prince-Bishop Conrad II
  - 1623–29, 1635–45: Administrator Frederick II
  - 1630–1631: Prince-Bishop Francis
  - 1631–1634: Admin. John Frederick
- Historical era: Middle Ages
  - Established: 1180
  - Secularised as the Principality of Verden: 15 May 1648

Area
- 1806: 730 km^{2} (280 sq mi)

Population
  - 1806: 20,000
Preceded by	Succeeded by
Duchy of Saxony	Kingdom of Westphalia

The Prince-Bishopric of Verden (Note: German: Fürstbistum Verden, Hochstift Verden or Stift Verden) was an ecclesiastical principality or Hochstift of the Holy Roman Empire, located in Lower Saxony, Germany. Established as a diocese of the Catholic Church in the middle of the 8th century, it was officially dissolved by the Peace of Westphalia in 1648, and replaced by the Duchies of Bremen-Verden.

== Location ==
The territory of the Prince-Bishopric of Verden covered the eastern part of the present district of Verden (its border ran between Langwedel and Etelsen), and the southern part of the district of Rotenburg (Wümme) and parts of the districts of Harburg and the Heath district (Heidekreis).

== History ==
=== Foundation ===
The Diocese of Verden was founded around 800 in Verden upon Aller as a suffragan in the ecclesiastical province of Mainz. When the old Duchy of Saxony was carved up in 1180, some of the territory around the Sturnmigau' was erected as a state in Imperial immediacy. The Bishop of Verden, in addition to his spiritual duties, was, ex officio, the temporal ruler of the Prince-Bishopric of Verden. The first Prince-Bishop — Tammo of Verden — ruled an area that was about a quarter of the extent of the diocesan territory. In 1195 Prince-Bishop Rudolph I founded the castle of Rotenburg upon Wümme as a stronghold against the neighbouring Prince-Archbishopric of Bremen. Later the castle took on the function of a prince-episcopal Residenz.

The bishops, and hence the prince-bishops, were elected by the cathedral chapter. However, the papacy tried to influence the elections and sometimes succeeded in getting their candidates elected. Such candidates, who were usually not local men, did not enjoy local support and were seen as Landfremde or alien.

From the early 16th century the prince-bishopric belonged to the Lower Rhenish–Westphalian Circle (colloquially: Westphalian Circle), a fiscal and military subsection of the empire. Verden sent its representatives to the Imperial Diet and to the Imperial Circle. While Verden, like the neighbouring County of Hoya, was a member of the Westphalian Circle, other adjacent territories, such as the Duchy of Brunswick-Lüneburg and the Prince-Archbishopric of Bremen, were part of the Lower Saxon Circle. At times, the prince-bishops also ruled the Prince-Archbishopric of Bremen in personal union. In order to maintain their two seats in the diets, the states of Bremen and Verden were never formally united in a real union. The same is true for the collectively governed Duchies of Bremen and Verden which emerged in 1648 from the two secularised prince-bishoprics.

=== The Reformation ===
From 1558, a gradual change of confession to Lutheranism took place across the Verden diocesan. Within the hochstift, the Reformation was concluded with the enactment of a church ordinance by Administrator Eberhard von Holle, in 1568. In 1630, during the Thirty Years' War, a Catholic bishop, Francis of Wartenberg, took over again as a consequence of the Edict of Restitution, but was only able to hold office until 1634. Thereafter, the Catholic Church was only represented there by the Apostolic Vicariate of Northern Missions.

=== Disestablishment ===
In 1648, by the terms of the Peace of Westphalia, the state was disestablished. In its place, a principality of the Empire was established that was ruled by the Swedish crown. The Principality of Verden was in turn disestablished in 1712. During this period, the principality was ruled in personal union with the territory of the former Prince-Archbishopric of Bremen; they were informally known as the Duchies of Bremen-Verden or more formally the "Duchy of Bremen and Principality of Verden".

== Sources ==
- Gesellschaft für die Geschichte des Bistums Verden e.V.: Bistum Verden, 770 bis 1648, Editions du Signe 2001, ISBN 2-7468-0384-4
- Bernd Kappelhoff, Thomas Vogtherr: Immunität und Landesherrschaft, Beiträge zur Geschichte des Bistums Verden, Schriftenreihe des Landschaftsverbandes der ehemaligen Herzogtümer Bremen und Verden, Stade 2002, ISBN 3-931879-09-7
- Thomas Vogtherr: Chronicon episcoporum Verdensium, Die Chronik der Verdener Bischöfe, Schriftenreihe des Landschaftsverbandes der ehemaligen Herzogtümer Bremen und Verden, Stade 1997, ISBN 3-931879-03-8
- Arend Mindermann: Urkundenbuch der Bischöfe und des Domkapitels von Verden, Band 1, Von den Anfängen bis 1300, Schriftenreihe des Landschaftsverbandes der ehemaligen Herzogtümer Bremen und Verden, Stade 2001, ISBN 3-931879-07-0
- Arend Mindermann: Urkundenbuch der Bischöfe und des Domkapitels von Verden, Band 2, 1300–1380, Schriftenreihe des Landschaftsverbandes der ehemaligen Herzogtümer Bremen und Verden, Stade 2004, ISBN 3-931879-15-1
