= Franz Wilhelm von Wartenberg =

Bavarian Catholic Bishop of Osnabrück

His Eminence Franz Wilhelm von Wartenberg
- Prince-Bishop of Osnabrück; Count von Wartenberg
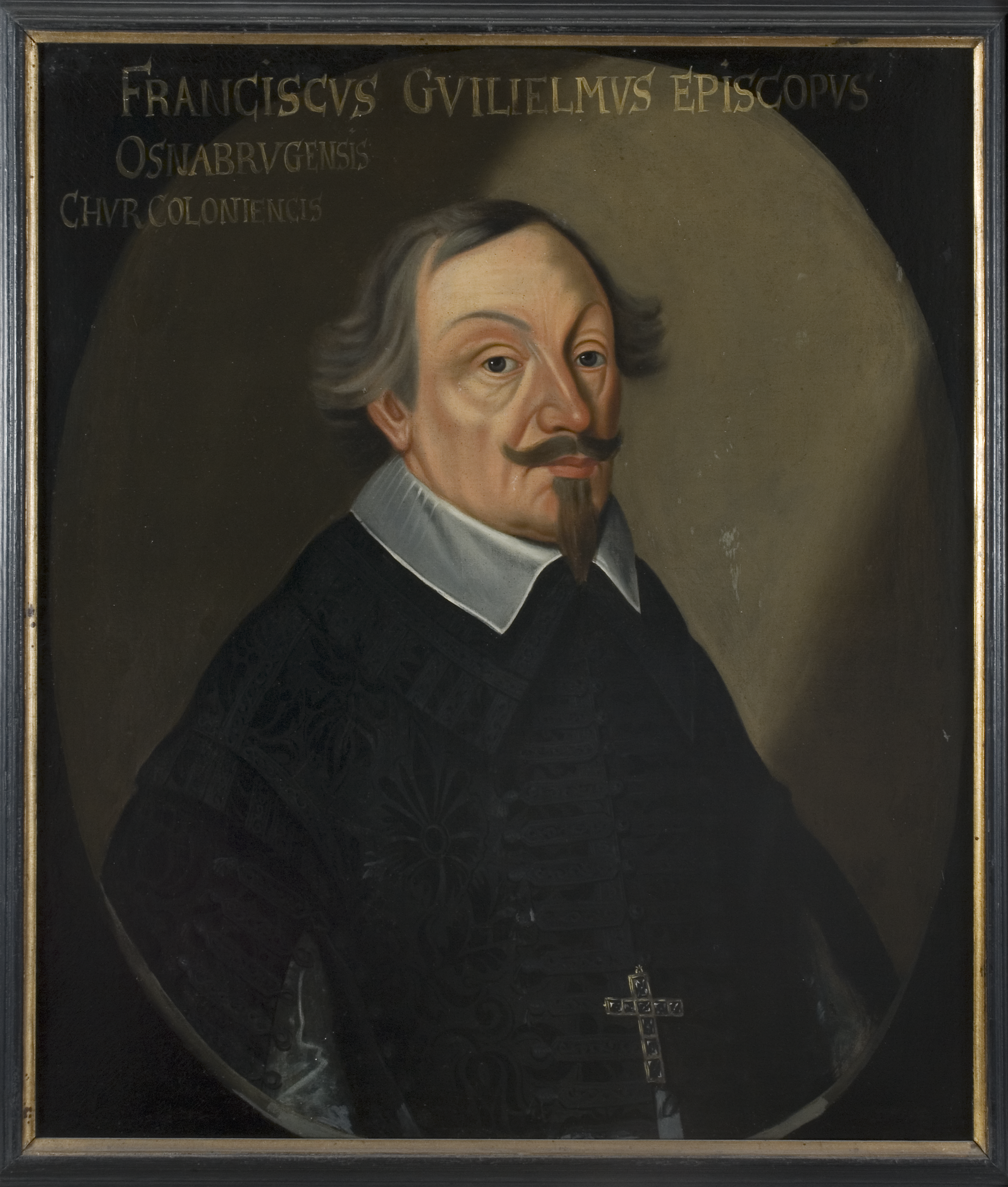
- Portrait of Cardinal Wartenberg, 17th century
- Church: Catholic Church
- Diocese: Osnabrück
- Appointed: 26 October 1625
- Term ended: 1 December 1661
- Predecessor: Eitel Frederick von Hohenzollern
- Successor: Ernest Augustus of Hanover
- Previous posts: See list: Prince-Bishop of Verden (1630–1631); Prince-Bishop of Minden (1631-1648)

Orders
- Ordination: 11 March 1618
- Consecration: 8 December 1636 by Malatesta Baglioni
- Created cardinal: 5 April 1660 by Pope Alexander VII
- Rank: Cardinal-Priest

Personal details
- Born: 1 March 1593 Munich, Bavaria
- Died: 1 December 1661 (aged 68) Regensburg, Bavaria

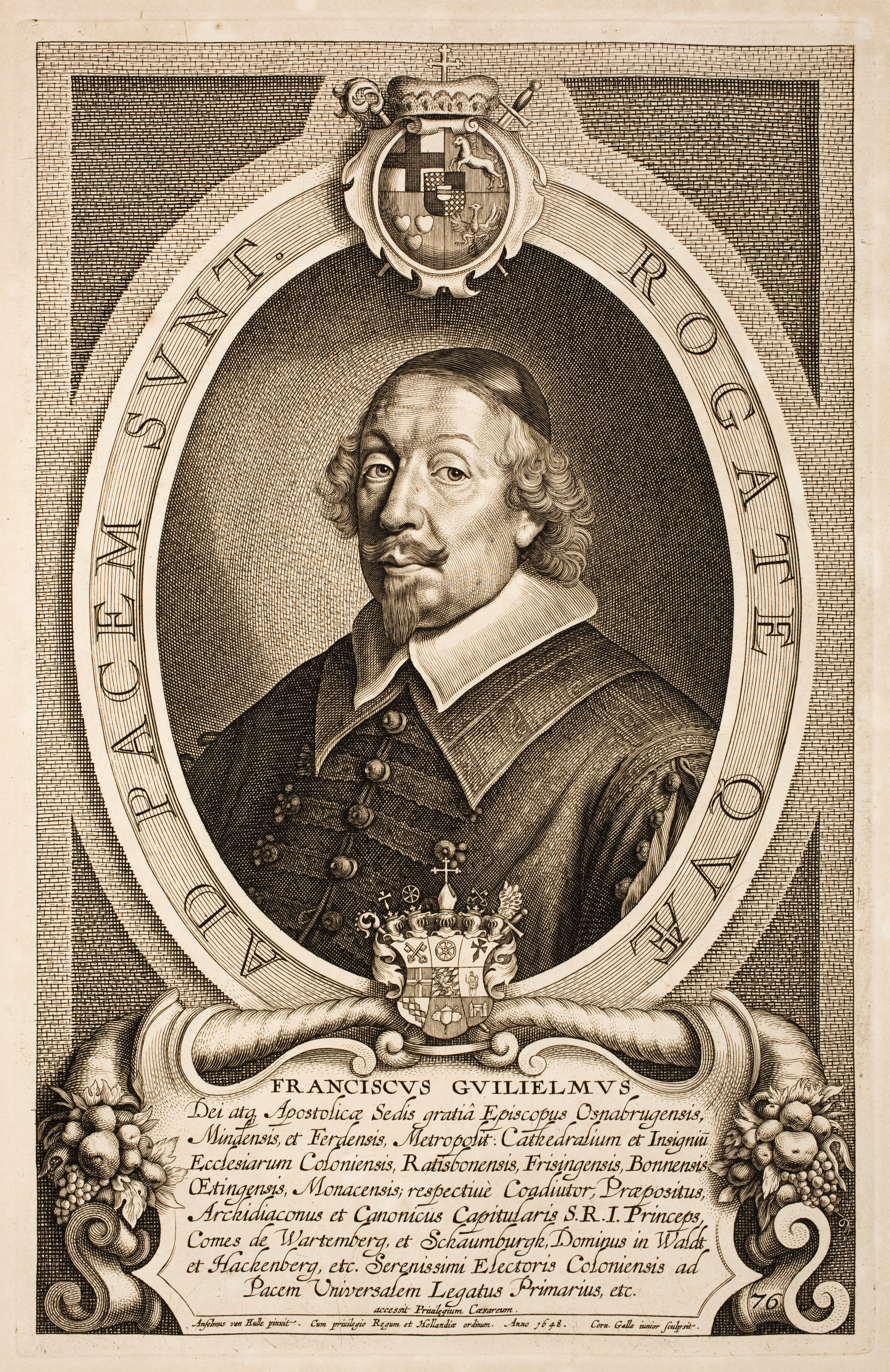
Engraving of Franz Wilhelm

Franz Wilhelm, Count von Wartenberg (born at Munich, 1 March 1593; died at Ratisbon, 1 December 1661) was a Bavarian Catholic Bishop of Osnabrück, expelled from his see in the Thirty Years' War and later restored, and at the end of his life a Cardinal.

== Life ==
He was the eldest son of Ferdinand of Bavaria and his morganatic wife Maria Pettenbeckin. He was educated by the Jesuits at Ingolstadt (1601-8), and at the Germanicum in Rome (1608–14).

In 1621, he became manager of the governmental affairs of the Elector Ferdinand of Cologne, who appointed him president of his council and brought him to the Diet of Ratisbon in 1622. On 26 October 1625, he was elected Bishop of Osnabrück, receiving papal approbation on 25 April 1626.

The three preceding bishops had been Protestants and had replaced most of the Catholic priests by Protestant preachers. Cardinal Eitel Friedrich, who succeeded them, endeavoured to restore the Catholic religion but soon died. With the help of Johann Tserclaes, Count of Tilly, Franz Wilhelm took possession of his see on 12 March 1628, which had been occupied by Danish soldiers. He began the work of Counter-Reformation, drove the Protestant preachers from the city and restored the churches to the Catholics. Franz Wilhelm eliminated the anti-Catholic element from the city council; took the system of education into his own hands; turned the former Augustinian convent over to the Jesuits whom he engaged as teachers at the Gymnasium Carolinum; restored various religious communities and established new ones; held synods and visitations, and enforced the Tridentine decrees where possible. In 1631, he founded a university which, however, was destroyed by the Swedes in 1633.

Franz Wilhelm was commissioned with the execution of the 1629 Edict of Restitution in Lower Saxony, and was elected later to the provostry of the collegiate church of Ss. Cassius and Florentius in Bonn. He was chosen Prince-Bishop of Verden in 1630, Bishop of Minden in 1631, and appointed Vicar Apostolic of Bremen by Pope Innocent X in 1645. In 1633 Osnabrück capitulated to the Swedes and Wartenberg had to yield his see to Gustavus of Wasaburg, an illegitimate son of Gustavus Adolphus.

During his forced exile, Franz Wilhelm, who had not yet received any of the major orders, was ordained priest and consecrated bishop at Ratisbon in 1636. In 1641 he went to Rome and upon his return was elected Coadjutor Bishop of Ratisbon cum jure successionis, succeeding on 9 April 1650.

In the negotiations of the Peace of Westphalia from 1645 to 1648 Franz Wilhelm represented the Catholic electors. Though preventing the intended secularization of his see by the Swedes, he had to yield to the stipulation that after his death the See of Osnabrück should be alternately administered by a Protestant and by a Catholic bishop. Franz Wilhelm was to keep the See of Osnabrück, but the Sees of Verden, Minden, and Bremen fell into the hands of Protestants, Franz Wilhelm, however, retaining spiritual jurisdiction over them.

On 18 December 1650, he took possession of the See of Osnabrück and worked to restore the Catholic religion. On 5 April 1661, he was created cardinal-priest by Pope Alexander VII.

== Sources ==
- Meurer, "Franz Wilhelm" inMittheilungen des hist. Vereins zu Osnabrück; X, XI, XXI (c. 1868–90).
- Forst, "Politische Korrespondenz des Grafen F. W. von Wartenberg aus den Jahren 1621-31" in Publikationen aus den k. preussischen Staatsarchiven; LXVIII (Leipzig, 1897).
- Goldschmidt, Bernard Anton, Lebensgeschichte des Kardinal-Priesters Franz Wilhelm, Grafen von Wartenberg, Fürstbischof von Osnabrück und Regensburg, Minden und Verden (Osnabrück: Richard, 1866)

Franz Wilhelm von Wartenberg Born: 1 March 1593 Died: 1 December 1661
Catholic Church titles
Regnal titles
Preceded by Eitel Frederick of Hohenzollern-Sigmaringen	Prince-Bishop of Osnabrück; 1625–1634	Succeeded by Gustav of Vasaborg as Lutheran administrator
Preceded by Gustav of Vasaborg as Lutheran administrator	Prince-Bishop of Osnabrück; 1648–1661	Succeeded by Ernest Augustus, Elector of Brunswick-Lüneburg as Lutheran administrator
Preceded by Frederick II, Crown Prince of Denmark as Lutheran administrator	Prince-Bishop of Verden; 1630–1631	Succeeded by John Frederick of Holstein-Gottorp as Lutheran administrator
Vacant Title last held by Christian the Elder of Brunswick and Lüneburg as Lutheran administrator	Prince-Bishop of Minden; 1631–1648	Secularised: Principality of Minden
Preceded by Albert IV of Toerring-Stein	Prince-Bishop of Regensburg; 1649–1661	Succeeded by John George of Herberstein
Catholic Church titles
Preceded by Leopold Wilhelm, Archduke of Austria^{1} as Catholic administrator	Vicar Apostolic to the Archdiocese of Bremen^{2} 1645–48	Secularised: Duchy of Bremen
Notes and references
1. Leopold Wilhelm was Catholic administrator, rather than prince-bishop, due to lack of canonical qualification 2. Vicar Apostolic is the provisional head of a See; Franz Wilhelm never gained pastoral influence, let alone power as prince-bishop, due to the Swedish occupation
