= List of bishops, prince-bishops, and administrators of Minden =

This list records the bishops of the Roman Catholic Diocese of Minden (German: Bistum Minden), a suffragan of the Archdiocese of Cologne, who were simultaneously rulers of princely rank (prince-bishop) in the Prince-Bishopric of Minden (German: Hochstift Minden; est. 1180 and secularised in 1648), a state of imperial immediacy within the Holy Roman Empire. Minden was the seat of the chapter, the cathedral and residence of the bishops until 1305, Petershagen became the prince-episcopal residence since.

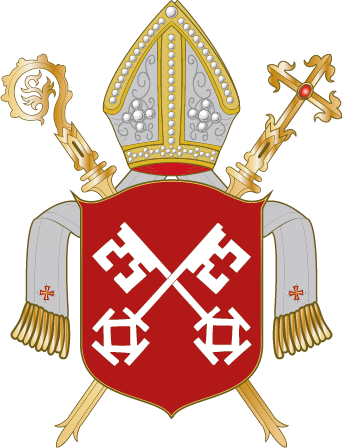
Coat-of-arms of the Prince-Bishopric of Minden

== Titles of the incumbents of the Minden See ==
In 1180 part of the Minden diocesan territory were disentangled from the Duchy of Saxony and became an own territory of imperial immediacy called Prince-Bishopric of Minden, a vassal of the Holy Roman Empire. The prince-bishopric was an elective monarchy, with the monarch being the respective bishop usually elected by the Minden Cathedral chapter, and confirmed by the Holy See, or exceptionally only appointed by the Holy See. Papally confirmed bishops were then invested by the emperor with the princely regalia, thus the title prince-bishop. However, sometimes the respective incumbent of the see never gained a papal confirmation, but was still invested the princely regalia. Also the opposite occurred with a papally confirmed bishop, never invested as prince. A number of incumbents, elected by the chapter, neither achieved papal confirmation nor imperial investiture, but as a matter of fact nevertheless de facto held the princely power. Between about 1555 to 1631 all incumbents were Lutherans. The respective incumbents of the see bore the following titles:

- Bishop of Minden until 1180
- Prince-Bishop of Minden from 1180 to 1554 and again 1631 to 1648
- Administrator of the Prince-Bishopric of Minden 1566 to 1630 and again 1631 to 1645. Either simply de facto replacing the Prince-Bishop or lacking canon-law prerequisites the incumbent of the see would officially only hold the title administrator (but nevertheless colloquially referred to as Prince-Bishop).

== Catholic Bishops of Minden till 1180 ==
Roman Catholic Bishops of Minden till 1180
Episcopate	Portrait	Name	Birth and death with places	Reason for end of office	Notes
803–813		Erkanbert also Ercumbert, Herkumbert, Herumbert	Gollachgau (near Würzburg), *unknown – 7 June 830*, Minden	resigned?	saint, feast day: 7 June
813–853		Hardward	*unknown – 16 September 853*, Minden	death	saint, feast day: 13 April
853–880		Theoderic as Dietrich I	*unknown – 2 February 880*, near Ebstorf	killed in action	martyr, saint, feast day: 2 February
880–886		Wulfhar also: Wulfar or Wolfer	*unknown – 15 September 886*, Minden	killed by invasors	
886–887		sede vacante			
887–902		Drogo	*unknown – 5 June 902*	death	
902–905		Adalbert			
905–914		Bernard			
914–927		Lothair			
927–950		Ebergisl			
950–958		Helmward			
958–969		Landward			
969–996		Milo			
996–1002		Ramward			
1002–1022		Dietrich as Dietrich II			
1022–1036		Siegbert also: Sigebert	*unknown – 1036*	death	
1037–1055		Bruno of Waldeck (House of Waldeck)	*c. 1000 – 10 February 1055*	death	
1055–1080		Egilbert	Bavaria, *unknown – 3 December 1080*	death	
1080–1089		Reinward			
1080–1096		Volkmar			
1089–1097		Ulrich			
1097–1112		Gottschalk			
1097–1105 and again 1113–1119		Widelo also Witelo, Wylo	*unknown – 28 December 1119*	death	as anti-bishop repressed in 1105, unrivalled in office since 1113
1120–1140		Sigward also: Siegward	*unknown – 1140*	death	
1140–1153		Henry Cuno as Henry I			
1153–1170		Werner	Bückeburg, *unknown – 1170*	death	celebrated the marriage of Henry the Lion and Matilda of England, Plantagenêt
1170–1185		Anno of Landsberg	*unknown – 1185*	death	

== Catholic Prince-Bishops (1180–1554) ==
Roman Catholic Prince-Bishops of Minden (1180–1554)
Reign and episcopate	Portrait	Name	Birth and death with places	Reason for end of office	Notes
1170–1185		Anno of Landsberg	*unknown – 1185*	death	
1185–1206		Thietmar also: Thiemo, modernised: Dietmar	Bavaria, *unknown – 5 March 1206*	death	saint, feast day: 5 March
1206–1209		Henry as Henry II	*unknown – 30 July 1209*	death	
1209–1236		Conrad of Rüdenberg also: of Diepholz as Conrad I	*unknown – 26 June 1236*	death	
1236–1242		William of Diepholz as William I (Counts of Diepholz)	*unknown – 2 May 1242*	death	brother of the next
1242–1253		John of Diepholz (Counts of Diepholz)	*c. 1175 – 13 January 1253*	death	brother of the former
1253–1261		Wedekind of Hoya as Wedekind I (Counts of Hoya)	*unknown – 1261*	death	son of Henry II, Count of Hoya
1261–1266		Cuno			
1266–1275		Otto as Otto I	Stendal, *unknown – 1275*		
1275–1293		Volkwin of Schwalenberg	*c. 1240/1245 – 4 May 1293*,	death	brother of Ludolph's brother's or sister's spouse
1293–1295		Conrad of Wardenberg as Conrad II	*unknown – 1295*	death	
1295–1304		Ludolph of Rostorf also: Rosdorf	Hardenberg, *c. 1240–1304*, Minden	death	brother of Volkwin's brother's or sister's spouse through his sister Jutta granduncle of the next
1304–1324		Godfrey of Waldeck (House of Waldeck)	*c. 1255/1260 – 14 May 1324*	death	brother of Adolf II of Waldeck; by his granduncle's wife also grandnephew of Ludolph moved the prince-episcopal residence to Petershagen castle
1324–1346		Louis of Brunswick-Lüneburg (House of Welf)	*c. 1300 – 18 July 1346*, Walsrode	death	son of Otto the Strict
1346–1353		Gerard of Schauenburg as Gerard I (House of Schaumburg)	*unknown – 1 January 1353*	death	son of Adolphus VI, Count of Schauenburg and Holstein-Pinneberg
1353–1361		Dietrich Kagelwit also Kugelweit, Dietrich of Portitz as Dietrich III	Stendal, *c. 1300 – 17 December 1367	became Prince-Archbishop of Magdeburg in 1361 (as Dietrich I)	before Bishop of Schleswig (1351–1353)
1361–1366		Gerard of Schaumburg as Gerard II (House of Schaumburg)	*unknown – 25 September 1366*		son of Adolphus VII, Count of Schauenburg and Holstein-Pinneberg
1366–1368		Otto of Wettin also: of Golßen as Otto II (House of Wettin)	*unknown – 16 July 1368*	death	son of Otto, Burgrave of Wettin and Golßen
1369–1383		Wedekind of Schalksberg also: Wittekind vom Berge as Wedekind II	*unknown – 1383*	death	son of Wedekind IV, Lord of Schalksberg
1384–1397		Otto of Schalksberg also: vom Berge as Otto III	*unknown – 1 January 1398*	resigned	last heir of the Lordship of Schalksberg, which he bequeathed to the Minden see; son of Wedekind IV, Lord of Schalksberg
1397–1398		Gerard of Hoya as Gerard III (Counts of Hoya)			
1398		Marquard of Randegg also: Randeck	*unknown – 28. December 1406*	became Prince-Bishop of Constance in 1398	nephew of Patriarch Marquard of Randeck
1398–1402		William of Buchen as William II		death	
1402–1403		sede vacante			
1403–1406		Otto of Rietberg as Otto IV	*unknown – 1406*	death	son of Otto II, Count of Rietberg
1406–1436		Wilbrand of Hallermund also: Wulbrand	*? – 23 December 1436*	death	before prince-Abbot of Corvey Abbey (1398–1406), last heir of the County of Hallermund, son of Wilbrand, Count of Hallermund,
1436–1473		Albert of Hoya; German: Albrecht (Counts of Hoya)			son of Eric I, Count of Hoya
1473–1508		Henry of Schauenburg as Henry III (House of Schaumburg)			son of Otto II, Count of Schauenburg and Holstein-Pinneberg
1508–1529		Francis of Brunswick-Wolfenbüttel as Francis I (House of Welf)	*1492 – 25 November 1529*, Wolfenbüttel	death	son of Henry IV
1530–1553		Francis of Waldeck as Francis II (House of Waldeck)	Sparrenberg Castle, *1491 – 15 July 1553*, Wolbeck (a part of today's Minden)	death	also Prince-Bishop of Münster (1532–1553) and of Osnabrück (1532–1553)
1553–1554		Julius of Brunswick and Lunenburg, Wolfenbüttel (House of Welf)	Wolfenbüttel, *29 June 1528 – 3 May 1589*, Wolfenbüttel	resigned, became heir to the Principality of Wolfenbüttel	Prince of Wolfenbüttel (1568–1589) and of Calenberg (1584–1589)

== Lutheran Prince-Bishop and Administrators of the Prince-Bishopric ==
Lutheran Prince-Bishop and Administrators of the Prince-Bishopric (1554–1631)
Reign and episcopate	Portrait	Name	Birth and death with places	Reason for end of office	Notes
1554–1566		George of Brunswick and Lunenburg, Wolfenbüttel (House of Welf)	*22 November 1494 – 4 December 1566*, Verden upon Aller	death	elected by the Minden chapter and papally confirmed bishop, turned Lutheran and thus later acceding only as administrator (lacking papal confirmation) of the Bremen and Verden sees (1558–1566)
1566–1582		Hermann of Schauenburg (House of Schaumburg)	*1545–1592*		son of Otto IV of Schaumburg
1582–1585		Henry Julius of Brunswick and Lunenburg, Wolfenbüttel (House of Welf)	Hessen am Fallstein, *15 October 1564 – 20 July 1613*, Prague	resigned, became Prince of Calenberg and of Wolfenbüttel in 1589	also administrator of the Prince-Bishopric of Halberstadt (1566–1613)
1585–1587		sede vacante			
1587–1599		Anthony of Schauenburg (House of Schaumburg)	*1549–1599*	death	son of Otto IV of Schaumburg
1599–1625		Christian of Brunswick and Lunenburg, Celle (House of Welf)	*9 November 1566 – 8 November 1633*	deposed	as Christian the Elder also Prince of Lunenburg-Celle (1611–1633)
1625–1631		sede vacante			

== Catholic Prince-Bishop (1631–1648) ==
Roman Catholic Prince-Bishop of Minden (1631–1648)
Reign and episcopate	Portrait	Name	Birth and death with places	Reason for end of office	Notes
1631–1648		Francis of Wartenberg as Francis III	Munich, *1 March 1593 – 1 December 1661*, Ratisbon	deposed by the Swedish conquerors	papally appointed, lacking the capitular elective mandate also Prince-Bishop of Osnabrück (1625–1634 and again 1648–1661), of Verden (1630–1631), of Ratisbon (1649–1661), and Vicar Apostolic of the Archdiocese of Bremen (1645/1648)
after 15 May 1648		The Prince-Bishopric was converted into a heritable monarchy, the Principality of Minden, ruled in personal union by the House of Hohenzollern in Brandenburg.			

== Auxiliary bishops ==
- Johann Christiani von Schleppegrell, O.S.A. (7 Jun 1428 to 8 Oct 1468)
- Johannes Tideln, O.P. (7 Feb 1477 to 28 Jul 1501)
- Ludwig von Siegen (bishop), O.F.M. (20 May 1502 to 13 Feb 1508)
- Johannes Gropengeter, O.S.A. (9 Jan 1499 to 25 Jan 1508)
- Heinrich von Hattingen, O. Carm. (10 Dec 1515 to 1519)

== Sources ==
- Website Chronik Alt-Minden (retrieved on 29 April 2010) (in German)
- "Liste der Bischöfe" on Lexikon des Mittelalters (in German)
