= Gerhard vom Berge =

Bishop of Hildesheim, Germany

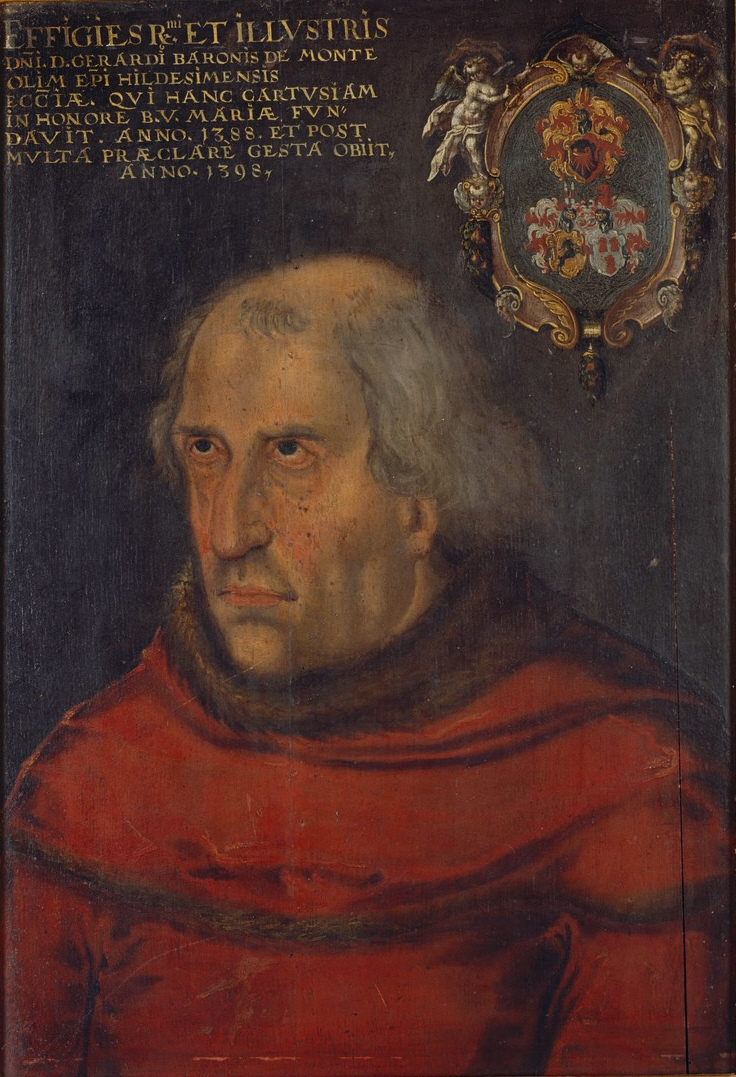
Gerhard vom Berge, Bishop of Verden and Hildesheim

Gerhard vom Berge or von Berg, also known as Gerhard of Schalksberg (died 15 November 1398), was a member of the vom Berge family, seated at Minden, and until 1397 the holders of the Vogtei rights over the bishopric of Minden. He was precentor and then dean in Minden Cathedral. He became Bishop of Verden from 1363 to 1365 and Bishop of Hildesheim from 1365 to his death on 15 November 1398.

In 1367 after winning the battle of Dinklar against Magnus I, Duke of Brunswick-Lüneburg (1345–1373), Gerhard built the imposing palas (residential structure including a great hall) at Burg Poppenburg (in the present Burgstemmen in Nordstemmen). He also founded Hildesheim Charterhouse in 1388.

Gerhard became involved in the War of the Lüneburg Succession (1371–1388), as a result of which the Welfs were obliged in 1380 to cede Burg Koldingen to him. Under his direction the fortress, situated on the left bank of the River Leine, became the seat of the newly created Amt Koldingen within the territory of the bishopric of Hildesheim.

Preceded by Daniel von Wichtrich	Prince-Bishop of Verden; 1363–1365	Succeeded by Rudolf Rühle

Preceded by Johannes Schadland	Prince-Bishop of Hildesheim; 1365–1398	Succeeded by Johannes von Hoya
