= Thietmar of Minden =

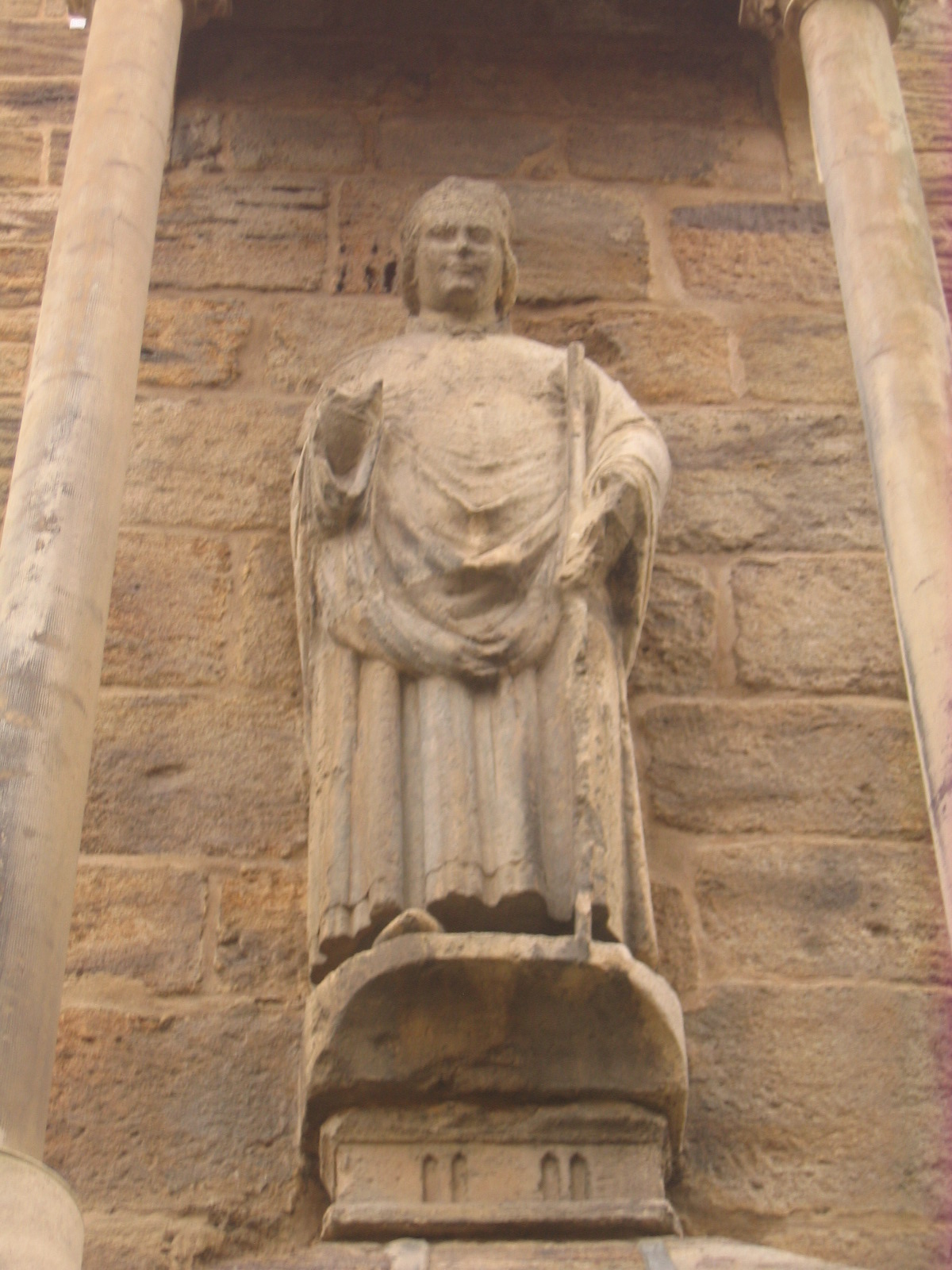
- Sculpture of Thietmar. Minden Cathedral.

Bishop
- Born: Bavaria
- Died: 5 March 1206; Minden
- Venerated in: Roman Catholic Church
- Feast: 5 March

Saint Thietmar (Dietmar, Thiemo) of Minden was bishop of Minden from 1185 or 1186 until his death in 1206. According to tradition, Thietmar was from Bavaria.

It was Thietmar's custom to eat only bread and water, although this practice physically weakened him. A legend states that one day, when water from the well was brought to him by a servant, it had become wine. The bishop rejected the wine and asked for water again. When he received wine again, Thietmar began to distrust his servant. The bishop accompanied the servant to the well. When the servant scooped up water, it again transformed itself into wine.

His feast day is March 5th.

Thietmar of Minden Born: in Bavaria Died: 5 March 1206 in Minden
Regnal titles
Catholic Church titles
Preceded by Anno of Landsberg	Prince-Bishop of Minden; 1185–1206	Succeeded by Henry II
