= Hans-Georg Koitz =

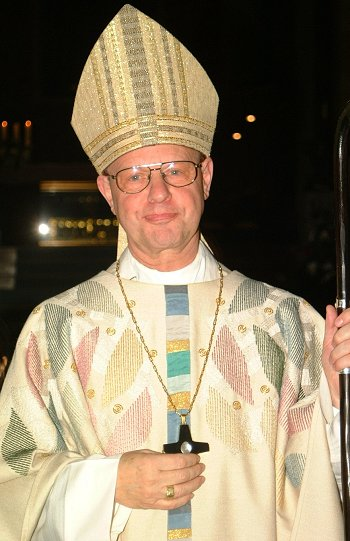
Bishop Hans-Georg Koitz (2002)

Hans-Georg Koitz (born 4 April 1935) is a prelate of the Roman Catholic Church. He served as auxiliary bishop of Hildesheim from 1992 till 2010, when he retired upon reaching the age of 75.

== Life ==
Born in Striegau, Koitz was ordained to the priesthood on 30 June 1962.

On 24 August 1992 he was appointed auxiliary bishop of Hildesheim and titular bishop of Cantanus. Koitz received his episcopal consecration on the following October 25 from Josef Homeyer, bishop of Hildesheim, with the auxiliary bishop emeritus of Hildesheim, Heinrich Pachowiak, and the auxiliary bishop of Hildesheim, Heinrich Machens, serving as co-consecrators.

As auxiliary bishop he was amongst other works responsible for the reparations of the Hildesheim cathedral in preparation for the 1200-year existence of the diocese in 2015. From 2004 till 2006 he was appointed diocesan administrator during the sede vacant period. In the German conference of bishops he was a member of the commissions for "Vocations and Religious Services" and "Education and Schools". Concerning child abuse cases he expressed that in his view this should not be a taboo topic and culprits should be brought to justice.

On 4 December 2010 Pope Benedict XVI accepted his retirement, on grounds of his age.
