= Forschungsinstitut für Philosophie Hannover =

Research institute in Hanover, Germany

Coordinates: 52.3752°N 9.7247°E

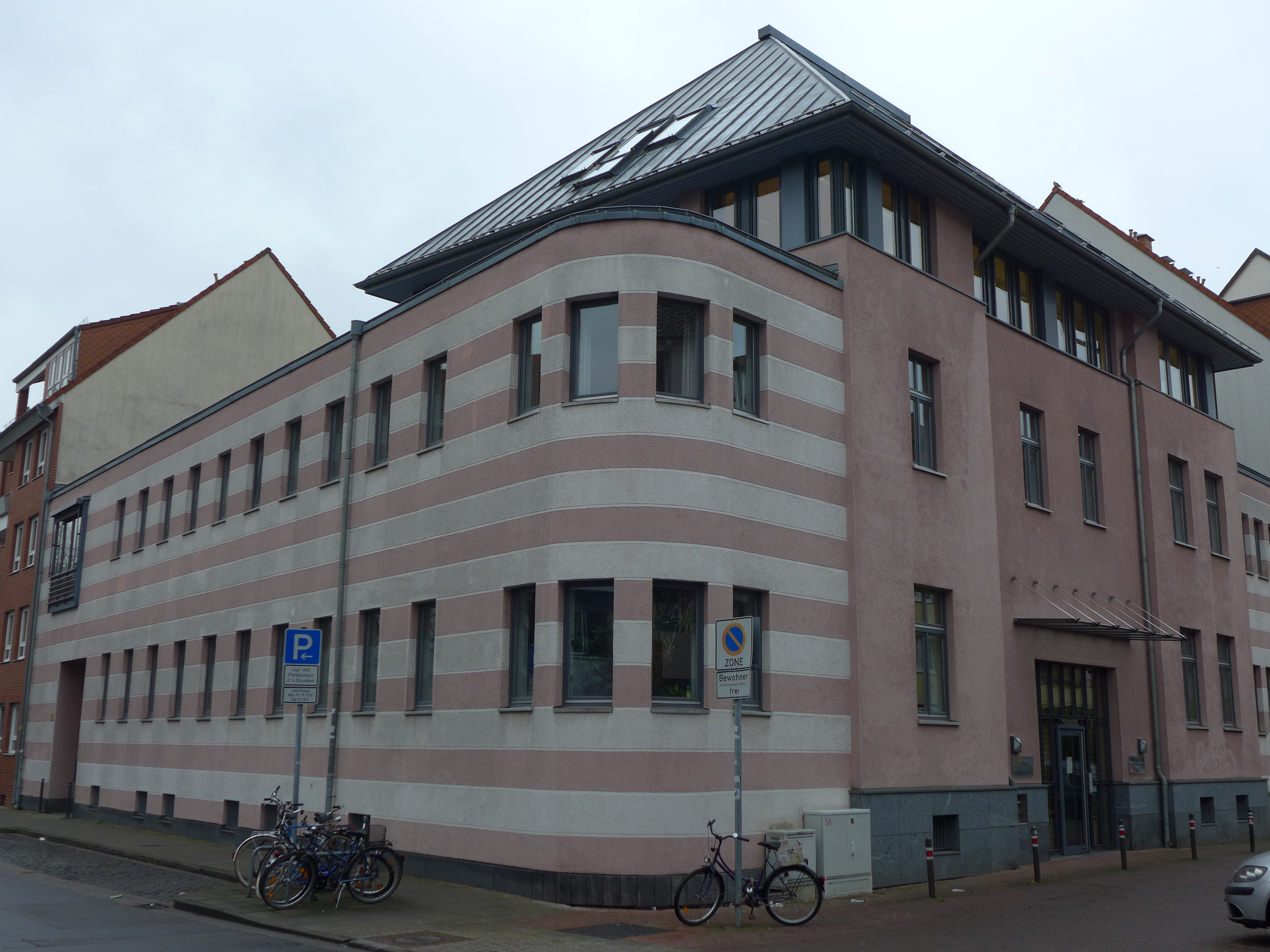
FIPH building

The Forschungsinstitut für Philosophie Hannover (English: Hannover Institute for Philosophical Research) is a research institute in Hanover, Germany. Its field of activity is philosophy. It is sponsored by the Roman Catholic Diocese of Hildesheim. It was founded by Josef Homeyer in 1988, and its first director was Peter Koslowski. The current director is Jürgen Manemann. Vittorio Hösle is an example of the philosophers who have been active at the institute, and research fellows are also accepted.

The institute deals with philosophical questions concerning democracy and human society, further fields are economic anthropology and environmental ethics. Questions of medical ethics and humanism are addressed as well.

The institute publishes its research results via a biannual journal, a blog, as well as philosophical volumes and monographs.
