= Hermann Billung =

Margrave of the Billung March from 936 to 973

- Royal governor of the Duchy of Saxony
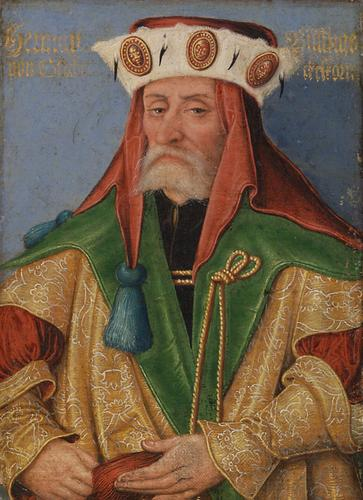
- Reign: 936–973
- Successor: Bernard I (as Duke of Saxony)
- Born: c. 900/912
- Died: 27 March 973; Quedlinburg, Germany
- Spouse: Oda; Hildegarde of Westerburg
- Issue: Bernard I, Duke of Saxony; Liudger of Saxony (Billung); Swanehilde of Saxony; Matilda of Saxony, Countess of Flanders; Imma
- House: House of Billung
- Father: Billung von Stubenskorn
- Mother: Ermengarde of Nantes

Hermann Billung (900 or 912 – 27 March 973) was a prominent German noble from Saxony in the East Frankish Kingdom, who was a notable military commander and count, serving as royal governor of the Duchy of Saxony during the reign of king and emperor Otto I (936–973). As such, he was entrusted with the defense of Saxon eastern regions and borders towards the neighboring Polabian Slavs. He became the founder of the House of Billung, that had a prominent role in the medieval history of northern German lands.

In older historiography, it was sometimes assumed that he was not only the royal governor, but also the Duke of Saxony, while his military commands and frontier endeavors in Slavic lands were seen as the establishment of a northeastern march (frontier region), named by later historians as the Billung March. Newer scholarly analyses have shown that such assumptions were lacking confirmation in reliable primary sources, since Hermann newer became the Saxon duke, nor did in his time exist an effective frontier province (march) in Slavic regions to the northeast of Saxon borders, across the lower Elbe river.

== Life ==
Hermann was probably the son of Billung. He was the younger brother of the Saxon count Wichmann the Elder. Hermann is generally counted as the first Billung duke (Herzog) of Saxony, but his exact position is unclear. The ducal Ottonian dynasty had risen to German royalty with the accession of Henry the Fowler in 919 and had to concentrate on countrywide affairs. At least in 961, when King Otto I of Germany marched against the Kingdom of Italy for the second time, he made Hermann the administrator (procurator regis) in his Saxon lands.

When in 936 King Otto I had ascended the throne, he appointed Hermann a margrave (princeps militiae), granting him the Saxon march north of the Elbe river. His Billung March stretched from the Limes Saxoniae in the west along the Baltic coast to the Peene River in the east, roughly corresponding with the later Mecklenburg region. Otto thereby disregarded the claims of Hermann's elder brother Count Wichmann, a brother-in-law of Queen Dowager Matilda. Wichmann in turn joined the unsuccessful rebellion of King Otto's half-brother Thankmar and Duke Eberhard of Franconia in 938. Having more autonomy than the contemporary margrave Gero ruling over the adjacent Marca Geronis in the south, Hermann exacted tribute from the local Polabian Slavs of the Obotrite tribal federation.

Upon his brother's death in 944, he also became count in the Saxon Bardengau around the town of Lüneburg, where he founded the monastery of St Michael in that city. He again disregarded the inheritance claims raised by his nephews Wichmann the Younger and Egbert the One-Eyed. In 953 both joined the countrywide rebellion started by King Otto's younger brother Duke Liudolf of Swabia, which only collapsed due to the massive invasion of Hungarian forces. During this grave crisis, the king, who was also Duke of Saxony, began entrusting more and more of his authority in the Saxon lands to Hermann during his absences. However, Hermann was never named dux in royal documents. Instead, he is named as a military leader, count, and margrave.

His position was solidified, when on 2 February 962 King Otto was crowned Holy Roman Emperor in Rome by Pope John XII. Hermann was received like a king by Archbishop Adalbert of Magdeburg in 972, which even annoyed the emperor. He may have been the founder of the Hermannsburg locality in the Lüneburg Heath, first mentioned in 1059.

Hermann died in Quedlinburg. His son Bernard inherited and strengthened his father's position and managed to be recognized as duke.

== Descendants ==
Hermann Billung perhaps was married twice: According to the chronicles of St Michael's Abbey in Lüneburg, a Countess Oda died on 15 March in an unknown year after 973, the Xanten annals noted the death of one Ode, spouse of Duke Hermann, on the same day. She probably was related to the royal Ottonian dynasty; Henry the Fowler's grandmother was named Oda (herself a member of the Billung dynasty), which was also the name of his sister. A second wife Hildesuith or Hildegard of Westerburg is mentioned in the chronicles, but her relation to Oda remains unclear. Hildegard was also the name of the spouse of Hermann's son Bernard. The name of Hermann's granddaughter Oda of Meissen suggests that Oda was the mother of his children.

He had five children:

- Bernhard I (died 1011), Duke of Saxony
- Liutger (died 26 February 1011), attested in 991, buried in St. Michaels in Lüneburg, married Emma of Lesum (died 3 December 1038), buried in the Bremen Cathedral.
- Suanhilde (born between 945 and 955, died 26 November 1014, buried in the monastery of Jena, reburied after 1028 in the Church of St. George in Naumburg, married:
  1. in 970 Thietmar I (died after 979) Margrave of Meissen,
  2. before 1000 Ekkehard I (murdered 30 April 1002 in Pöhlde); became in 992 Margrave of Meissen, buried in the monastery of Jena, reburied after 1028 in the Church of St. George in Naumburg
- Mathilde (born between 935 and 945, died 25 May 1008 in Ghent, buried in St. Peter's church), married:
  1. "shortly before 961" to Baldwin III, Count of Flanders (died 1 January 962),
  2. Gottfried der Gefangene (died on 3/4 April after 995) in 963/982, Count of Verdun (Wigeriche), buried in St. Peter's church in Ghent
- Imma (died in 995), Abbess of Herford.

== See also ==
- Duchy of Saxony
- Polabian Slavs

== Sources ==
- Bachrach, Bernard S.; Bachrach, David S., eds. (2014). Widukind of Corvey: Deeds of the Saxons. Washington: The Catholic University of America Press.
- Rotter, Ekkehart; Schneidmüller, Bernd, eds. (1981). Widukind von Corvey: Res gestae Saxonicae: Die Sachsengeschichte. Stuttgart: Reclam.
- Stieldorf, Andrea (2026) [2012]. Marken und Markgrafen: Studien zur Grenzsicherung durch die fränkisch-deutschen Herrscher (2nd ed.). Wiesbaden: Harrassowitz Verlag.
- Trillmich, Werner, ed. (1957). Thietmar von Merseburg: Chronik. Darmstadt: Wissenschaftliche Buchgesellschaf.
- Warner, David A., ed. (2001). Ottonian Germany: The Chronicon of Thietmar of Merseburg. Manchester and New York: Manchester University Press.

Hermann Billung House of Billung Born: 900 or 912 Died: 27 March 973
| Preceded by First | Margrave of the Billung March; 936–973 | Succeeded by Bernard I |
