= Liudger of Saxony (Billung) =

Younger brother of the Saxon Duke Bernhard I

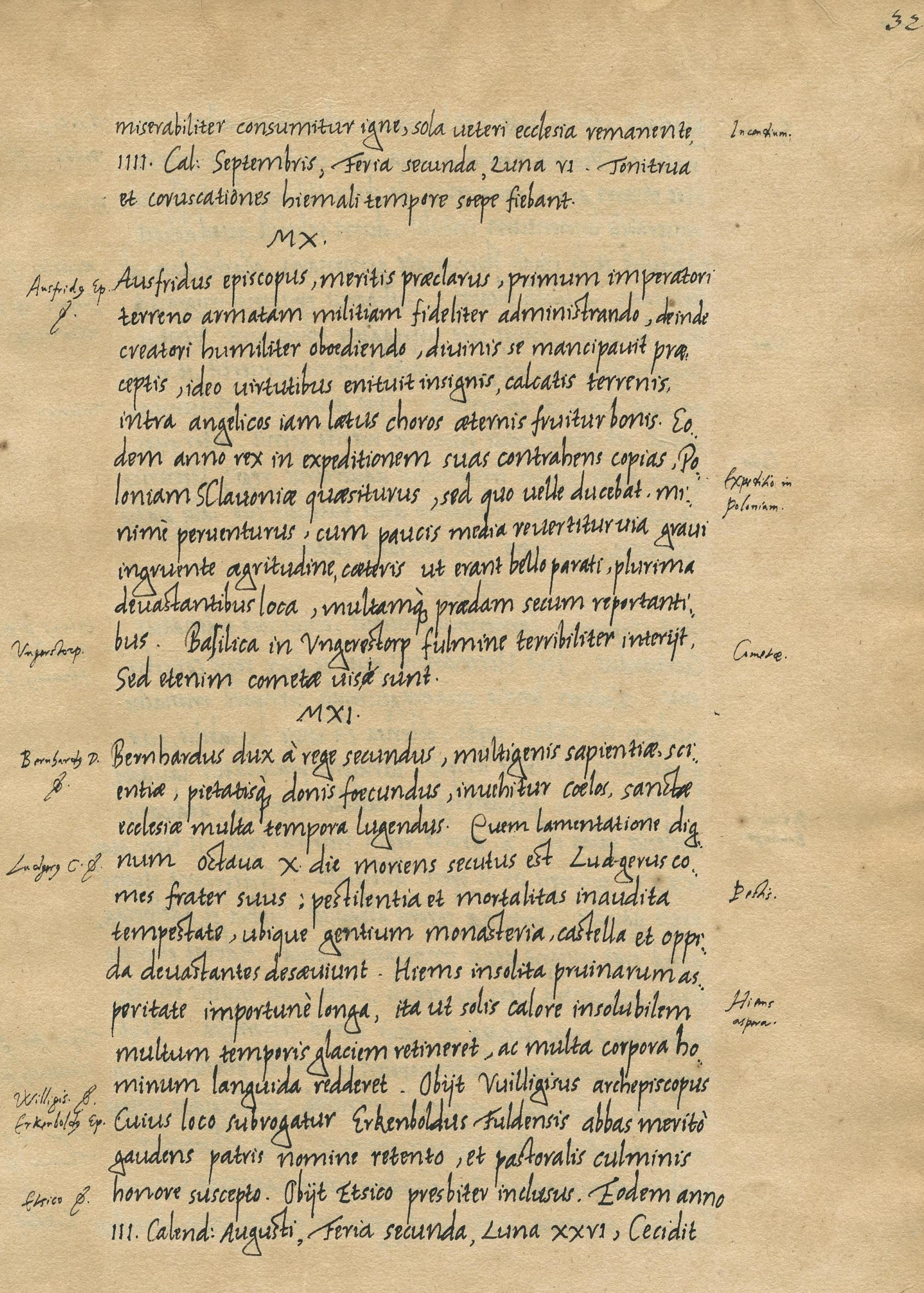
News of Liudger's death in an entry for the year 1011 in the Annals of Quedlinburg (copy from the mid-16th century; SLUB Dresden, Mscr. Dresd. Q.133, no. 4, sheet 32r).

Liudger (also Liutger, Ludiger, Liudiger or Luderus, Low German: Lüder; died 26 February 1011) was the younger brother of the Saxon Duke Bernhard I of the Billung dynasty. In the historical sources Liudger is called Graf (count). There he appears almost only at the side of his older brother.

Liudger's position within the Billung princely house has not yet been conclusively clarified in medieval studies. While some historians regard him as a wealthy fellow heir next to his older brother, who also had his own rights of rule, Liudger, according to Gerd Althoff, is said to have led only a shadowy existence as a "substitute man" for Duke Bernhard I.

== Origin and family ==
Liudger was the son of Hermann Billung. His older brother Bernhard succeeded his father as duke in Saxony upon the latter's death. Liudger had two sisters, Mathilde and Schwanhild.

Liudger was married to Emma. Liudger's descendants have not been handed down. In the Gesta Hammaburgensis ecclesiae pontificum from the time around 1070, the Bremen Cathedral Scholaster Adam of Bremen reports of a daughter of Liudger's wife Emma who is not named. Adam does not mention the father. Nevertheless, part of the research has always assumed that it was not only Emma's daughter, but also Liudger's. Male descendants of the couple are also discussed. In the life history of the Paderborn bishop Meinwerk, the Vita Meinwerci, the later Paderborn bishop Imad is described as the son of Meinwerk's sister. In the Gesta Hammaburgensis ecclesiae pontificum it is said that Emma was the sister of this Meinwerk. Nevertheless, a descent of Imad from Emma is doubted, because the note about the relationship of Emma with Meinwerk was inserted only in a copy from the time after 1160. Conversely, the Vita Meinwerci knows Emma as wife of Liudger, but not as sister of Meinwerk. Instead, it names Glismod and Adela as Meinwerk's sisters.

== Powers ==
The question of Liudger's powers within the noble family of the Billung is answered inconsistently in research. This concerns both a possible participation in the rule of his older brother Bernhard I. as well as possible own rights of rule as count.

=== Participation in the reign of Bernhard I. ===
About Liudger's political importance for the reign of his older brother nothing certain can be inferred from the medieval sources. There only Bernhard I. is referred to as duke. As the head of the most powerful and richest noble family in northern Saxony, he was characterized by a special closeness to the royal court. According to tradition, he was one of the closest advisors of the kings and emperors Otto II (973-983), Otto III (983-1002) and Henry II (1002-1024). Accordingly, he is frequently mentioned in medieval documents, annals and chronicles. In contrast, Liudger is mentioned only in passing.

Despite this finding, part of the medieval research assumes that Liudger played an important role for the rule of the Billung dynasty in Saxony, without determining it in more detail. This assessment is based primarily on news from the chronicle of the abbey of St. Michaelis in Lüneburg, the house abbey of the Billung dynasty. In it it is said that both brothers succeeded their father Hermann in the ducal dignity and inherited him jointly. The chronicle dates from the time between 1229 and 1233 and was thus written only about 200 years after Liudger's death. Nevertheless, it is considered credible, since the author of the chronicle is said to have had older documents, which are lost today. The chronicle is based on the chronicle of the abbey of St. Michael in Lüneburg. Moreover, the medieval research seems to suggest Liudger's participation in the rule of his older brother Bernhard I, also in view of the ruling practice of the Billung ducal house in the following generations. Bernhard I's son Thietmar also had a share in the dominion alongside his older brother Duke Bernhard II. had a share in the dominion. And Bernhard's II son Herrmann even represented his older brother Duke Ordulf for several years at the head of the princely house. Finally, it is noticeable that Liudger almost always emerges at the side of his brother Bernhard I. In a record of the outcome of the boundary negotiations between the bishoprics of Hildesheim, Minden and Verden from the period between January 15 and May 13, 993, "Duke Bernhard and his brother Liudger" head the list of secular witnesses (Bernhardi ducis suique fratris Liudgeri).

Gerd Althoff, in his study on group ties in the Middle Ages published in 1990, shows the limits of Liudger's position within the noble family of the Billung. According to this, Liudger's role was limited to that of a "substitute" for the older brother. Only the recognition of Bernhard's primogeniture and the subordination to his claim to rule would have made it possible for Liudger to remain at the court in the first place, in order to step in in the interest of the family in case of the regent's failure. In no case Liudger's participation in the rule of the Billung dynasty had been presented as co-rule, and in the inheritance of the father he had been involved at most in smaller extent. In contrast to this, Althoff in his habilitation thesis from 1984 still held the view that Liudger as the younger brother had directly participated in the rule of the ducal dynasty. Ernst Schubert took a mediating standpoint in the debate with Althoff's assessment. Although Liudger had subordinated himself to the older brother, nevertheless an amicable brotherly cooperation was to be determined, which secured the peace within the noble dynasty of the Billung. He said that Liudger was the only brother who had a direct share in the rule of the dukes.

=== Liudger's own rulership rights ===
On the basis of the few news about Liudger it is discussed with different results whether Liudger as count had his own rights of rule or at least the necessary landed property. The focus of the considerations are two documents of Otto III as well as a passage from the Gesta Hammaburgensis ecclesiae pontificum of Adam of Bremen.

==== Deed donation for Minden ====
In the older document of Otto III, Liudger gives his consent to a land donation by the king to the Minden bishop Milo and the Minden church. The donation took place on 9 September 991 and was made by Otto III on the Brandenburg. The eleven-year-old king had recaptured the fortress, which had been lost in the course of the Slavic uprising of 983, from the Lutici at the head of a Slavic revolt of 983. After taking the castle, he issued a document there in a demonstrative act of rule. In it, he gave the bishop of Minden Milo the forests of Petershagen and Stioringowald and added the forest "Suntel" west of the Weser to the border of the bishopric, today's Wiehen Hills. Both Duke Bernhard I and Liudger gave their consent to the transfer of the forest area. From this it is first deduced that both were on site and jointly led the Saxon army contingent. It can be assumed that they had to agree to the transfer because they had rights to the Suntelwald, which they now gave up in favor of the Minden bishop. Nestor of Billung research, the Lüneburg archivist Anton Christian Wedekind, interpreted the joint consent in 1835 with a co-ownership of both brothers in the forest. Wedekind generally assumed that the statements of the Lüneburg chronicle about a joint succession of the brothers to the inheritance of their father were correct. In contrast, Ruth Bork in her 1951 dissertation classified Liudger's consent as an indication of his sole ownership of the Suntel forest.

==== Deed donation for Liudger ====
In the recent document of Otto III, Liudger himself is the recipient of an imperial donation. At the intervention of his brother Bernhard I and the Bishop of Paderborn Meinwerk, he received the manor house Stiepel with all living and dead inventory in a document issued in Ravenna, Italy, on April 27, 1001. The location of the manor house is described in the document as "in the county of this Count Liudger and in the Westfalengau" (in comitatu ipsius Liutgeri comitis et in pago Westfalon). However, the existence of a county of Liudger at the Ruhr has been doubted several times. The manor house was far away from the other possessions of the Billung dynasty, which were concentrated between the Weser and the Elbe. Long-distance or scattered ownership was not uncommon in the Middle Ages, especially since in this way crop failures could be compensated by yields in other places. However, further long-distance possessions of the Billung dynasty on the Ruhr have not been handed down. Paul Derks considers it possible that the specification of the count's rights is a later addition, which would therefore have no historical source value. The document was only handed down in copy in a Bremen cartulary from the 14th century. Since the cartulary burned after the bombing of the Royal Air Force on Hanover in the night of October 9, 1943 in the Hanover department, a further clarification is no longer possible.

==== Lesum property ====
Extensive property of Liudger on the Weser is deduced from a casual note in Adam of Bremen. The latter reports in connection with the news about the death of Liudger's wife Emma, the estate Lismona was confiscated because of an unknown offense of Emma's daughter by Emperor Conrad II. The extent of this estate was extraordinary. It consisted, among other things, of 700 farms, a large forest area, coastal strips and scattered property around Bremen. Adam of Bremen does not comment on an origin of the goods from Emma's or Liudger's property. The classification of Lesum as a hereditary property of the Billung dynasty goes back to a subsequent appropriation of a count Hermann (comes Herimannus) as an ancestor of the Billung dynasty, as it was done for example by Richard Drögereit. Hermann is mentioned as a count in Lesum in a manuscript about the miracles of the bishop Willehad of Bremen, written between 860 and 865 by Ansgar.

== Death and commemoration ==
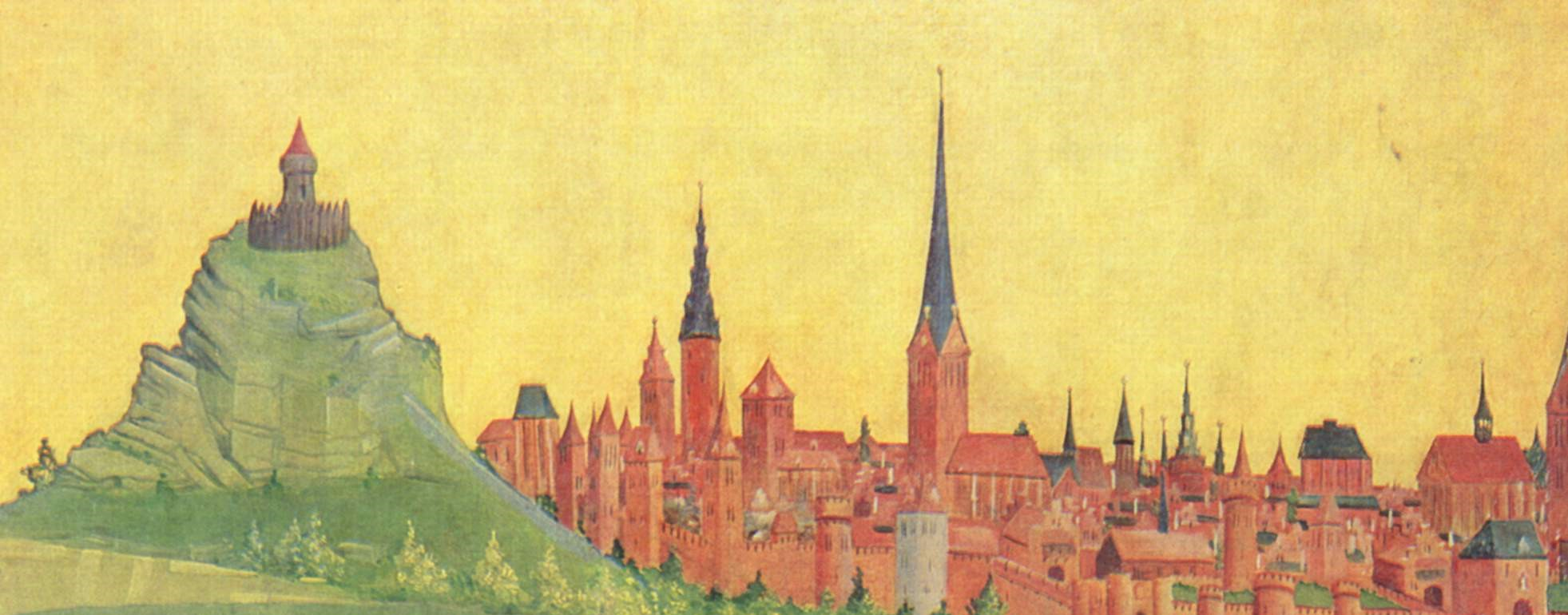
Hans Bornemann: Detail of an altar wing of the Heiligental altar in St. Nicolai (Lüneburg), c. 1450. On the left the Lüneburg Kalkberg, on which the Michaelis abbey was located until 1371, burial place of Liudger.

Liudger died in 1011, as did his brother Bernhard a few days before him. He was buried in front of the main altar of the crypt of St. Michael's abbey in Lüneburg, which was demolished in 1371, right next to his brother. On the grave slab, which no longer exists, there was an inscription in Latin. According to it, Liudger, like his brother, contributed to the glory of his family. The necrology of the church of St. Michael in Lüneburg contains an entry in his memory under February 26, as does the necrology of the Möllenbeck abbey. The Annals of Quedlinburg, the Vita Meinwerci and the Annalista Saxo also note his death.

== Sources ==
- Bernhard Schmeidler (ed.): Scriptores rerum Germanicarum in usum scholarum separatim editi 2: Adam von Bremen, Hamburgische Kirchengeschichte (Magistri Adam Bremensis Gesta Hammaburgensis ecclesiae pontificum). Hanover, 1917 (Monumenta Germaniae Historica, digitalised)
- This series of the Monumenta Germaniae Historica is not recognised
- Johann Friedrich Böhmer, Mathilde Uhlirz: Regesta Imperii II, 3. Die Regesten des Kaiserreiches unter Otto III. Wien u. a. 1956.
- Martina Giese: Die Annales Quedlinburgenses (= Monumenta Germaniae Historica, Scriptores rerum germanicarum in usum scholarum separatim editi. 72.). Hahn, Hannover 2004, ISBN 3-7752-5472-2 (Zugleich: München, Universität, Dissertation, 1999; Digitalisat).
