= List of bishops of Hildesheim =

This list records the incumbents of the Roman Catholic Diocese of Hildesheim (German: Bistum Hildesheim). Between 1235 and 1803 the bishops simultaneously officiating as rulers of princely rank (prince-bishop) in the Prince-Bishopric of Hildesheim (German: Hochstift Hildesheim), a state of imperial immediacy within the Holy Roman Empire. Hildesheim is the seat of the bishops and the cathedral chapter.

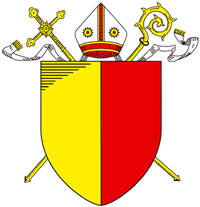
Coat-of-arms of the Diocese and Prince-Bishopric of Hildesheim

== Titles of the incumbents of the Hildesheim See ==
Between 1235 and 1803 the elected and papally confirmed bishops of the Hildesheim See were additionally imperially invested princely power as prince-bishops. In 1235 part of the Hildesheim diocesan territory, the episcopal and capitular temporalities (Stift) were disentangled from the Duchy of Brunswick and Lunenburg and became an own territory of imperial immediacy called Prince-Bishopric of Brunswick and Lunenburg (German: Hochstift Hildesheim), a vassal of the Holy Roman Empire. The prince-bishopric was an elective monarchy, with the monarch being the respective bishop usually elected by the Hildesheim Cathedral chapter and confirmed by the Holy See, or exceptionally only appointed by the Holy See. Papally confirmed bishops were then invested by the emperor with the princely regalia, thus the title prince-bishop. However, sometimes the respective incumbent of the see never gained a papal confirmation as bishop (lacking canonical qualification; e.g. Ferdinand of Bavaria and Frederick of Denmark), but was still invested the princely regalia. The respective incumbents of the see bore the following titles:

The respective incumbents of the see bore the following titles:

- Bishop of Hildesheim from 815 to 1235
- Prince-bishop of Hildesheim from 1235 to 1803
- Bishop of Hildesheim since 1803

== Bishops of Hildesheim till 1235 ==
This is the list of bishops of the Diocese of Hildesheim
Name	From	To	Remarks
Gunthar	815	834	
Rembert	834	835	
Ebbo	835	847	Archbishop of Reims 816–835
Altfrid	847	874	
Ludolf	874	874	
Marquard	874	880	
Wigbert	880	908	
Waldbert	908	919	
Sehard	919	928	
Diethard	928	954	
Otwin	954	984	
Osdag	985	989	
Gerdag	990	992	
Bernward	993	1022	
Godehard	1022	1038	
Thietmar	1038	1044	
Azelin	1044	1054	
Hezilo	1054	1079	
Udo of Gleichen-Rheinhausen	1079	1114	
Bruning	1115	1119	canonically irregular, not consecrated but imperially invested
Berthold I of Alvensleben	1119	1130	
Bernard I	1130	1153	
Bruno	1153	1161	
Herrmann of Wennerde	1162	1170	
Adelog of Dorstadt	1171	1190	
Berno	1190	1194	
Conrad I of Querfurt	1194	1199	Prince-Bishop of Würzburg 1198–1202
Heribert of Dahlem	1199	1216	
Siegfried I of Lichtenberg	1216	1221	
Conrad II of Reifenberg	1221	1246	

== Prince-bishops of Hildesheim between 1235 and 1803 ==
This is the list of prince-bishops of Diocese and Prince-Bishopric of Hildesheim
Name	From	To	Remarks
Conrad II of Reifenberg	1221	1246	imperially recognised as bishop of princely rank in 1235
Henry I of Rusteberg	1247	1257	
John I of Brakel	1257	1260	
Otto I of Braunschweig-Lüneburg	1260	1279	
Siegfried II of Querfurt	1279	1310	
Heinrich II of Woldenberg	1310	1318	
Otto II of Woldenberg	1318	1331	
Henry III of Brunswick and Lunenburg	1331	1363	
Erich I of Schauenburg	1332	1349	
Johann II Schadland	1363	1365	Bishop of Culm 1359–1363; Prince-Bishop of Worms 1365–1370; Prince-Bishop of Augsburg 1371–1372; Administrator of the Prince-Bishopric of Constance 1371–1372
Gerhard of Berg	1365	1398	Prince-Bishop of Verden 1363–1365
John III of Hoya	1398	1424	Prince-Bishop of Paderborn 1394–1399
Magnus of Saxe-Lauenburg	1424	1452	Prince-Bishop of Cammin 1410–1424
Bernhard III of Brunschwick and Lunenburg	1452	1458	Prince of Lunenburg 1457–1464
Ernst I of Schauenburg	1458	1471	
Henning of Haus	1471	1481	
Berthold II of Landsberg	1481	1502	Prince-Bishop of Verden 1470–1502
Eric II of Saxe-Lauenburg	1503	1504	Prince-Bishop of Münster 1508–1522
John IV of Saxe-Lauenburg	1504	1527	
Balthasar Merklin	1527	1531	Prince-Bishop of Constance 1530–1531
Otto III of Schauenburg	1531	1537	Count of Schauenburg and Holstein-Pinneberg 1544–1576
Valentin of Teutleben	1537	1551	
Frederick of Denmark	1551	1556	not consecrated for being Lutheran; also Bishop of Schleswig 1551–1556
Burkhard of Oberg	1557	1573	
Ernest II of Bavaria	1573	1612	Prince-Bishop of Freising 1566–1612; Prince-Bishop of Liège 1581–1612; Prince-Abbot of Stablo-Malmedy 1581–1612; Elector- Archbishop of Cologne 1583–1612; Prince-Bishop of Münster 1584–1612
Ferdinand of Bavaria	1612	1650	Administrator only, due to lack of canonical qualification; Administrator of the Berchtesgaden Provostry 1594–1650; Elector of Cologne and Administrator of the Archdiocese of Cologne 1612–1650; Administrator of the Prince-Bishopric of Liège 1612–1650; Administrator of the Prince-Bishopric of Münster 1612–1650; Administrator of the Imperial Abbey of Stablo-Malmedy 1612–1650; Administrator of the Prince-Bishopric of Paderborn 1618–1650
Maximilian Henry of Bavaria	1650	1688	Elector- Archbishop of Cologne 1650–1688; Prince-Bishop of Liège 1650–1688; Prince-Provost of Berchtesgaden 1650–1688; Prince-Abbot of Stablo-Malmedy 1657; Prince-Bishop of Münster 1683–1688
Jobst Edmund of Brabeck	1688	1702	
Joseph Clemens of Bavaria	1702	1723	Prince-Bishop of Regensburg 1685–1716; Elector- Archbishop of Cologne 1688–1723; Prince-Bishop of Freising 1685–1694; Prince-Bishop of Liège 1694–1723; Prince-Provost of Berchtesgaden 1688–1723
Clemens August of Bavaria	1723	1761	Prince-Bishop of Regensburg 1716–1719; Elector- Archbishop of Cologne 1723–1761; Prince-Bishop of Münster 1719–1761; Prince-Bishop of Paderborn 1719–1761; Prince-Bishop of Osnabrück 1728–1761
Sede vacante	1761	1763	
Friedrich Wilhelm von Westphalen	1763	1789	Prince-Bishop of Paderborn 1782–1789
Franz Egon von Fürstenberg	1789	1825	Prince-Bishop of Paderborn 1789–1803

== Bishops of Hildesheim since 1803 ==
This is the list of Bishops of the Diocese of Hildesheim
Name	From	To	Remarks
Franz Egon of Fürstenberg	1789	1825	Bishop of Paderborn 1789–1825
Karl of Gruben	1825	1829	administrator
Gotthard Joseph Osthaus	1829	1835	
Franz Ferdinand Friedrich Fritz	1836	1840	
Jakob Joseph Wandt	1842	1849	
Eduard Jakob Wedekin	1850	1870	Administrator of Osnabrück 1855–1857
Daniel Wilhelm Sommerwerck	1871	1905	
Adolf Bertram	1906	1914	Archbishop of Breslau 1914–1945
Joseph Ernst	1915	1928	
Nikolaus Bares	1929	1934	Bishop of Berlin 1933–1935
Joseph Godehard Machens	1934	1956	
Heinrich Maria Janssen	1957	1983	
Josef Homeyer	1983	2004	
Sede vacante	2004	2006	
Norbert Trelle	2006	2017	
Heiner Wilmer	2018		

== Auxiliary bishops ==
- Johann Christiani von Schleppegrell, O.S.A. (7 Jun 1428 to 8 Oct 1468)
- Johann Anguli Wilkelmann, O.F.M. (28 November 1436)
- Johannes Tideln, O.P. (7 Feb 1477 to 28 Jul 1501)
- Ludwig von Siegen (bishop), O.F.M. (20 May 1502 to 13 Feb 1508)
- Balthasar Fannemann (Waneman) (26 Aug 1540 to 8 Oct 1561)
- Nikolaus Arresdorf, O.F.M. Conv. (23 Nov 1592 to 28 Mar 1620)
- Johannes Pelking (Pelcking), O.F.M. Conv. (16 Dec 1619 to 28 Dec 1642)
- Adam Adami, O.S.B. (16 Dec 1652 to 19 Feb 1663)
- Johann Heinrich von Anethan (6 Jul 1665 to 13 Nov 1676)
- Friedrich von Tietzen-Schlütter (12 Dec 1677 to 4 Nov 1696)
- Maximilian Heinrich von Weichs zu Rösberg (1 Oct 1703 to 20 Sep 1723)
- Ernst Friedrich von Twickel (27 Sep 1724 to 17 Jan 1734)
- Johann Wilhelm von Twickel (27 Jun 1735 to 10 Sep 1757)
- Ludwig Hatteisen, O.S.B. (2 Oct 1758 to 3 Apr 1771)
- Johannes Bydolek (10 Sep 1949 to 18 Oct 1957)
- Heinrich Pachowiak (27 May 1958 to 24 Aug 1992)
- Adolf Kindermann (11 Jul 1966 to 23 Oct 1974)
- Heinrich Machens (24 Mar 1976 to 11 Feb 1994)
- Hans-Georg Koitz 24 Aug 1992 to 4 Dec 2010)
- Nikolaus Schwerdtfeger (19 Jun 1995 -)
- Heinz-Günter Bongartz (4 Dec 2010 -)
