= Conrad II (bishop of Hildesheim) =

Bishop of Hildesheim

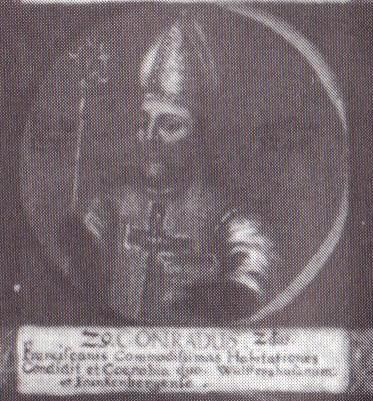
Portrait on a late 18th-century medallion

Conrad II of Reifenberg (German: Konrad II.; late 12th century – 18 December 1249) was Bishop of Hildesheim from 1221 to 1246. During his tenure, the Bishopric of Hildesheim was raised to an Imperial State (Hochstift), when Conrad was vested with secular rights of a prince-bishop by Emperor Frederick II in 1235.

== Life ==
Born into the noble family of Reifenberg or Reisenberg, he studied at the University of Paris, and is said to have taught theology there as well, and to have preached against the Albigenses. Back in the Holy Roman Empire, Conrad was dean of the Speyer Cathedral from 1209 to 1216, and a scholastic at the Mainz Cathedral from 1216 to 1221, during which time he oversaw the recruitment in Germany for the Fifth Crusade.

He was appointed Bishop of Hildesheim in 1221, becoming part of a new wave of bishops with a reputation for scholarship, which was at the time not common in Germany. He was noted for both his ecclesiastical and temporal leadership of the bishopric. During his time as bishop, he engaged in a notable disputation with Heinrich Minneke, the provost of Neuwerk, and oversaw the canonization of the recently deceased Elizabeth of Hungary, which took place on 27 May 1235. In the same year Hildesheim's episcopal and capitular temporalities (the Stift) was imperially recognized as a state of imperial immediacy, the Prince-Bishopric of Hildesheim. Conrad II died in 1249 in Schönau Abbey.

== Notes ==
Conrad of Reisenberg or Reifenberg Born: late 12th century Died: 18 December 1249
Catholic Church titles
Regnal titles
Preceded by Siegfried I as bishop	Bishop and then Prince-Bishop of Hildesheim (as of 1235); 1221–1246	Succeeded by Henry I as prince-bishop
