= Heiner Wilmer =

German Catholic prelate

His Excellency Heiner Wilmer SCJ
- Bishop of Münster
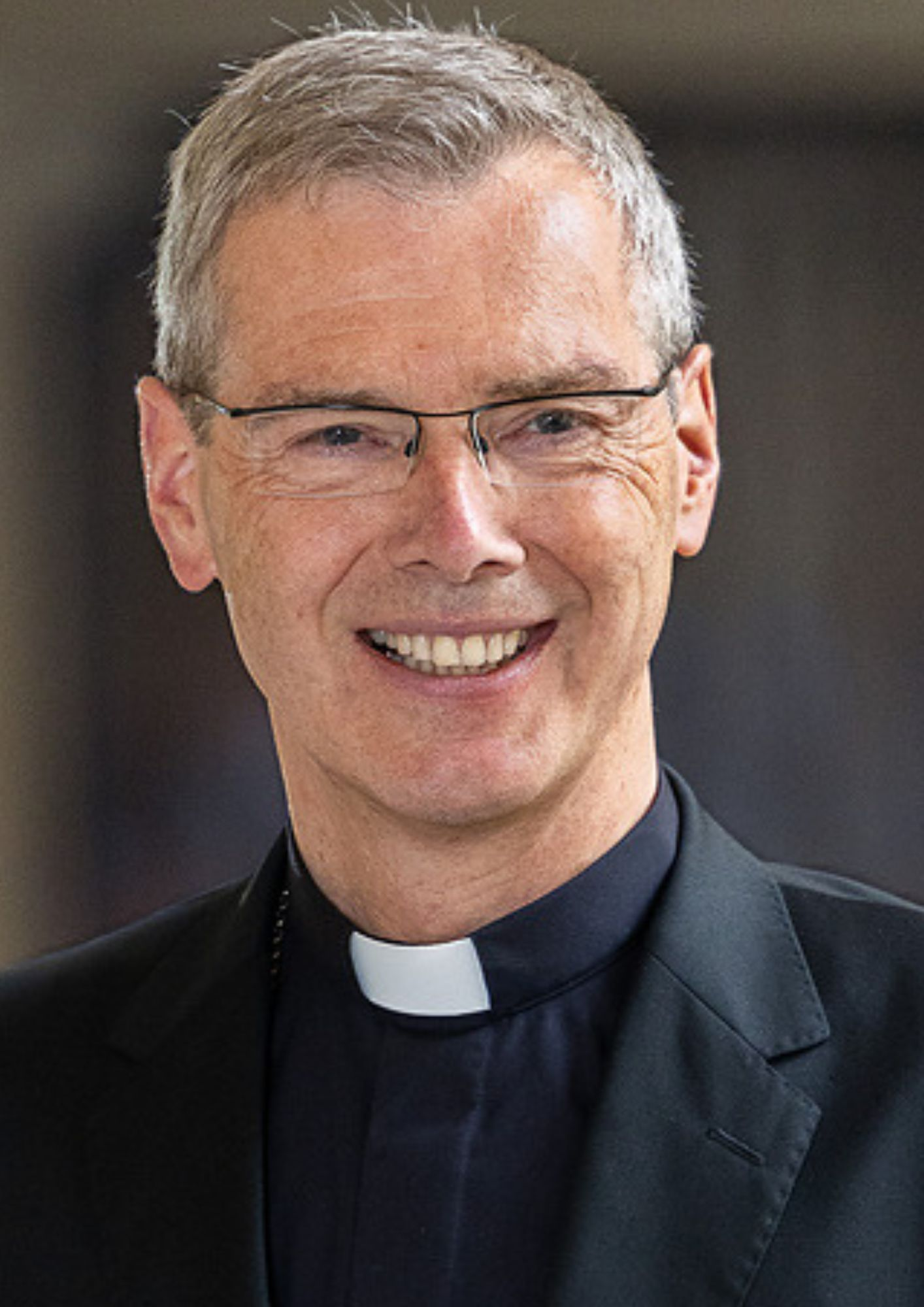
- Church: Catholic
- Diocese: Münster
- Appointed: 26 March 2026
- Installed: 21 June 2026
- Predecessor: Felix Genn
- Other posts: Chairman, German Bishops' Conference (2026–)
- Previous post: Bishop of Hildesheim (2018–2026)

Orders
- Ordination: 31 May 1987 by Oskar Saier
- Consecration: 1 September 2018 by Stefan Heße

Personal details
- Born: Heinrich Theodor Wilmer; 9 April 1961 (age 65) Emsland, West Germany
- Education: Pontifical Gregorian University; University of Freiburg
- Motto: Adiutores gaudii vestri (Work together for joy)
- Coat of arms

Heiner Wilmer (born 9 April 1961) is a German Catholic prelate who was named Bishop of Münster in March 2026. He served as the Bishop of Hildesheim from 2018 to 2026. He has been chairman of the German Bishops' Conference since February 2026. A member of the Priests of the Sacred Heart (Dehonians), he was provincial superior of the German Dehonians from 2007 to 2015 and superior general of the worldwide order from 2015 to 2018.

== Biography ==
Heinrich Theodor Wilmer was born on 9 April 1961 in Schapen (Emsland) and grew up on his family's farm. In 1980, he graduated from the Leoninum, a high school operated by the Dehonians in Handrup near his hometown. In August 1980, he joined the Dehonians, and from 1980 to 1982, he studied at their novitiate in Freiburg. He took his first vows as a member of the order in 1982 and his final vows in 1985. He was attracted, he later explained, to the order's spirituality and experienced doubts and skepticism rather than a singular religious experience. He completed his studies in preparation for ordination in Freiburg and Paris.

He was ordained a priest on 31 May 1987 by Oskar Saier, Archbishop of Freiburg. He then studied at the Pontifical Gregorian University in Rome, focusing on French philosophy. In 1991, Wilmer earned a doctorate in fundamental theology at the University of Freiburg with a dissertation on the concept of mysticism in the philosophy of Maurice Blondel. His work was awarded the Theology Faculty's Bernhard Welte Prize.

In 1993, he worked for four months as a chaplain at L'Arche Daybreak in Toronto, a residential home for people with disabilities. From 1993 to 1995, he worked as a teacher in training (Referendar) at Windthorst-Gymnasium in Meppen, and from 1995 to 1997 he taught religion, political science, and history at the Liebfrauenschule Vechta, while also serving as school chaplain. In 1996/97 he also worked to develop a training program for women in a penitentiary in Vechta. He taught German and history for the academic year 1997/98 at Fordham Preparatory School, a Jesuit high school in the Bronx (New York City). He also worked in the Jesuits' soup kitchen there. From 1998 to 2007 he was headmaster of the Leoninum in Handrup, where he had been a student. He spent three months in 2006 as a missionary in Caracas, Venezuela.

Wilmer was elected provincial superior of the German Province of the Dehonians, serving from 2007 to 2015. On 25 May 2015, the Dehonians elected Wilmer to a six-year term as their superior general. He described his mission: "The Catholic Church has, in part, not yet learned to understand its position of non-centrality. The Church is no longer a leader in the pluralism of the world and must find new forms of existence in light of its own marginality." He emphasized the order's increased international work and the importance of "social engagement". During the three years he spent in Rome, he belonged to an informal group of heads of religious orders who supported Pope Francs' reforms. He also traveled the world visiting Dehonian missions.

On 6 April 2018, Pope Francis appointed Wilmer as Bishop of Hildesheim. Pope Francis had telephoned him to encourage him to accept the appointment. On 1 September, Wilmer received his episcopal consecration from Stefan Heße and was installed as bishop. He chose as his episcopal motto Adiutores gaudii vestri (Work together for joy) from II Corinthians I:24. As bishop he advocated for increased roles for women in the Church, an end to mandatory celibacy for priests, and rigorous investigations into clerical sexual abuse.

Wilmer has been a member of the Plenary Assembly and the Standing Council of the German Bishops' Conference. Since 2022, he has chaired the Commission for Social and Societal Issues, and in that role, he has represented the German Bishops' Conference at the Commission of the Bishops' Conferences of the European Union (COMECE). From 2019 to 2024, he chaired the German Commission Justitia et Pax, a central advisory body of the Roman Catholic Church in Germany.

On 24 February 2026, Wilmer was elected to a six-year term as chairman of the German Bishops' Conference.

On 26 March 2026, Pope Leo XIV appointed Wilmer as Bishop of Münster. He was installed as bishop at Saint Paul's Cathedral on 21 June.

== Positions ==
In a June 2019 interview, Wilmer discussed the issue of priestly celibacy. He said that he himself is "a willingly passionate celibate religious," but the unmarried state of the clergy could be made to shine even brighter if it were not mandatory for all clerics. He voted for the text of the German Synodal Way in favor of reforming Catholic sexual teaching.

== Selected works ==
- Mystik zwischen Tun und Denken: ein neuer Zugang zur Philosophie Maurice Blondels, Herder, Freiburg, 1992, ISBN 3-451-22864-5
- Wer leben will, muss aufbrechen: spirituell lernen von Brasilien, Don Bosco, Munich, 2010, ISBN 978-3-7698-1807-9
- Johannes Duns Scotus "Tractatus de primo principio": wissenschaftstheoretische Überlegungen, Bonn, 2013, ISBN 978-3-00-040881-6
- Gott ist nicht nett, Herder, Freiburg, 2013, ISBN 978-3-451-32581-6
- Hunger nach Freiheit. Mose: Wüstenlektionen zum Aufbrechen, Herder, 2018, ISBN 978-3-451-37945-1. Co-author: Simon Biallowons. The book's nominal subject is Moses "as a model for modern existence", but it is a reflection on Wilmer's experiences, including encounters with Protestants and his conflict with older colleagues when working as headmaster in Handrup.
- Trägt. Die Kunst, Hoffnung und Liebe zu glauben Herder, Freiburg, 2020, ISBN 978-3-451-83871-2
- Herzschlag: Etty Hillesum – Eine Begegnung, Herder, 2024, ISBN 978-3-451-03492-3 A "dialogue" between Wilmer and Etty Hillesum, a Dutch Jewish diarist who died in Auschwitz in 1943.

Catholic Church titles
Preceded by José Ornelas Carvalho	Superior General of the Dehonians; 2015–2018	Succeeded by Carlos Enrique Caamaño Martín
Preceded by Norbert Trelle	Bishop of Hildesheim; 2018–present	Incumbent
Preceded by Georg Bätzing	President of the German Bishops' Conference; 2026–present	Incumbent
