= Norbert Trelle =

German prelate

His Excellency Norbert Trelle
- Bishop of Hildesheim
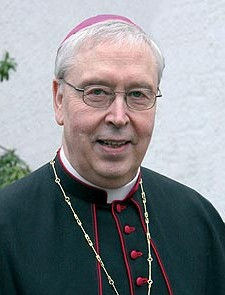
- Bishop Norbert Trelle
- Church: Roman Catholic
- Diocese: Diocese of Hildesheim
- Appointed: 29 November 2005
- Installed: 11 February 2006
- Term ended: 9 September 2017
- Predecessor: Josef Homeyer
- Other post: Auxiliary Bishop of Köln

Orders
- Ordination: 2 February 1968 by Cardinal Josef Frings
- Consecration: 1 May 1992 by Cardinal Joachim Meisner

Personal details
- Born: 5 September 1942 (age 83) Kassel, Germany
- Motto: Fundamentum Est Christus Jesus
- Coat of arms

Norbert Trelle (born 5 September 1942) is a prelate of the Roman Catholic Church. He served as auxiliary bishop of Cologne from 1992 till 2005, when he became bishop of Hildesheim.

== Life ==
Born in Kassel, Trelle was ordained to the priesthood on 2 February 1968.

On 25 March 1992 he was appointed auxiliary bishop of Cologne and titular bishop of Egnatia. Trelle received his episcopal consecration on the following 1 May from Joachim Cardinal Meisner, archbishop of Cologne, with the auxiliary bishop emeritus of Cologne, Augustinus Frotz, and the auxiliary bishop of Cologne, Klaus Dick, serving as co-consecrators.

On 29 November 2005 he was appointed bishop of Hildesheim, where he was installed on 11 February 2006 untíl 9 September 2017.

Norbert Trelle Born: 5 September 1942 in Kassel
Catholic Church titles
Vacant Title last held by Josef Homeyer; 2004-2006 sede vacante	Bishop of Hildesheim; 2006 – 2017	Succeeded by Heiner Wilmer SCJ
