= Peter Koslowski =

- Born: 2 October 1952; Göttingen, Germany
- Died: 15 May 2012 (aged 59)
- Occupations: Professor of Philosophy, Vrije Universiteit Amsterdam

Academic background
- Education: University of Tübingen; LMU Munich; Virginia Tech

Academic work
- Institutions: Witten/Herdecke University

Peter Koslowski (2 October 1952 – 15 May 2012) was a professor of philosophy who specialized in the philosophy of management and organisation and the history of modern philosophy at the Vrije Universiteit Amsterdam (VU University Amsterdam).

== Biography ==
He was born in Göttingen, Germany, in 1952, and studied at the University of Tübingen, LMU Munich, and Virginia Tech. He earned his doctorate in philosophy (Dr. phil.) in 1979 and his master's degree in economics (Dipl.-Volkswirt) 1980 (both LMU Munich).

- 1985-87 Professor and director, Institut für das Studium fundamentale, Witten/Herdecke University. Adjunct Professor of Philosophy and Political Economy 1987-2004
- 1987-2001 Founding director, Forschungsinstitut für Philosophie Hannover (The Hannover Institute of Philosophical Research)
- 1996-2001 Founding director of its Centrum für Ethische Ökonomie und Wirtschaftskultur (Center for Ethical Economy and Business Culture);
- 2002-2003 Visiting scholar and advisor, Liberty Fund, Inc., Indianapolis, USA
- 2003-2004 Fellow, International Center for Economic Research (ICER), Turin, Italy
- 2004-date Professor of philosophy, Vrije Universiteit Amsterdam, Amsterdam, Netherlands

=== Other appointments ===
1980-date Chair, CIVITAS. Society for the Promotion of Science and Art, Munich; 1991-96 Member of the Jury for the Max-Weber-Prize for Economic Ethics; Visiting professor Jesus College Oxford in 1993 and Hitotsubashi University Tokyo in 1994 on invitation of the Japan Society for the Promotion of Science; 1989/90 Member of the Working Group "Ethical and Social Aspects of the Exploration of the Human Genome" of the German Federal Minister for Research and Technology; 1995- Member of the Board of Advisors of the German Business Ethics Network (DNWE); 1995-2002 Director, Project "East | West | Philosophy" for the Scholarly Exchange with Russia; 1997-2003 Director, Project "A Discourse of the World Religions" at the World Exposition EXPO 2000 Hannover, Germany (together with the Foundation of Lower Saxony and the Foundation of the Hannover Institute of Philosophical Research), 1997- Chair of the Froum for Economic Ethics and Economic Culture, German Philosophical Association (Deutsche Gesellschaft für Philosophie); 2002- Chair of the Working Group "Compliance and Ethics in Financial Institutions in the German Business Ethics Network"; 2001- Member, Executive Committee, ISBEE-International Society for Business, Economics, and Ethics; 2002-2003 Member of the jury for the Prize for Intergenerational Justice of the Stiftung für die Rechte zukünftiger Generationen (Foundation for the Rights of Future Generations), Germany;

=== Lectures and honours ===
- 2002 gave the De Vries Lecture in Economics of the Professor F. de Vries Foundation (together with Patrick Bennett, Yale University) at Rotterdam, Netherlands
- 1998-2003 Senator, Stiftung Niedersachsen (The Foundation of Lower Saxony)
- 1998 Honorary Doctorate Degrees from A. I. Herzen Russian State University St. Petersburg and Russian State University of Commerce Moscow
- 2001 Recipient of the Order of Merit of the Federal Republic of Germany Bundesverdienstkreuz

== Publications ==
=== Principal books ===
Koslowski has written numerous books (listed below) and co-authored/edited many more.

- The Ethics of Banking. Conclusions from the Financial Crisis (2011). German original: Ethik der Banken. Folgerungen aus der Finanzkrise (2009), Chinese translation forthcoming.
- Principles of Ethical Economy (2000, paperback edition 2001). German original: Prinzipien der Ethischen Ökonomie (1988, 2nd ed. 1994), French, Chinese, Russian translations.
- Ethics of Capitalism, with a Comment by James M. Buchanan, in: Ethics of Capitalism and Critique of Sociobiology. Two Essays (1996). German original: Ethik des Kapitalismus. Mit einem Kommentar von James M. Buchanan (1982, 7th ed. 2010), Chinese, Spanish, Russian, Japanese, Korean translations.
- Die postmoderne Kultur (The Postmodern Culture, 1987, 2nd ed. 1988; Chinese, Italian, Japanese, Russian, Ukrainian translations).
- Philosophien der Offenbarung. Antiker Gnostizismus, Franz von Baader, Schelling (Philosophies of Revelation. Ancient Gnosticism, Franz von Baader, Schelling), 2001, 2nd ed. 2003.
- Der Mythos der Moderne. Die dichterische Philosophie Ernst Jüngers (The Myth of Modernity. The Poetic Philosophy of Ernst Jünger), 1991. Russian translation).
- Vaterland Europa (Fatherland Europe. National and European Identity in Conflict, with Rémi Brague, 1997).
- Wirtschaft als Kultur (The Economy as Culture, 1989).
- Politik und Ökonomie bei Aristoteles (Politics and Economics in Aristotle, 1976, 3rd ed. 1993).
- Gesellschaft und Staat. Ein unvermeidlicher Dualismus (Society and State. An Inevitable Dualism, 1982; Russian translation).
- Staat und Gesellschaft bei Kant (State and Society in Kant (1985).
- Nachruf auf den Marxismus-Leninismus (Farewell to Marxism-Leninism, 1991; Russian translation).

As Editor:

- Friedrich Gentz: The Origin and Principles of the American Revolution, Compared with the Origin and Principles of the French Revolution (1800), edited and with an Introduction by Peter Koslowski, translated by John Quincy Adams (6th President of the United States of America) (2009), Chinese translation forthcoming. Free edition available online: http://oll.libertyfund.org/index.php?option=com_staticxt&staticfile=show.php%3Ftitle=2376&Itemid=28
- Elements of a Philosophy of Management (2010).
- The Discovery of Historicity in German Idealism and Historism (2005).
- A Discourse of the World Religions, 5 Vols., Vol. 1: God, the Origin of the World, and the Image of the Human in the World Religions, Vol. 2: The Origin and Overcoming of Evil and Suffering, Vol. 3: Nature and Technology in the World Religions, Vol. 4: Progress, Apocalypse, and Completion of History and Life after Death of the Human Person in the World Religions, 2001–2002; Vol. 5: Philosophy Bridging the World Religions, 2003 (German edition: Diskurs der Weltreligionen, 5 Vols. 2000-2002).
- Gnosis und Theodizee. Eine Studie über den leidenden Gott des Gnostizismus (Gnosticism and Theodicy. A Study about the Suffering God of Gnosticism, 1993).
- Evolution and Society. An Assessment of Sociobiology, in: Ethics of Capitalism and Critique of Sociobiology (1996, German edition: Evolution und Gesellschaft. Eine Auseinandersetzung mit der Soziobiologie, 1989; French and Russian translations).
- Die Prüfungen der Neuzeit. Über Postmodernität (The Examinations of the Modern Age. On Postmodernity, 1989).
- Die Kulturen der Welt als Experimente richtigen Lebens. Entwurf für eine Weltausstellung (The Cultures of the World as Experiments of the Right Life. A Design for a World Exhibition [The World Exposition EXPO 2000 Hannover] (1990).
