= Johannes Gropengeter =

German Roman Catholic prelate

Most Reverend Johannes Gropengeter
- Auxiliary Bishop of Minden; Titular Bishop of Paneade
- Church: Catholic Church
- Diocese: Diocese of Minden
- In office: 1499–1508

Johannes Gropengeter, O.S.A. was a Roman Catholic prelate who served as Auxiliary Bishop of Minden (1499–1508).

== Biography ==
Johannes Gropengeter was ordained a priest in the Order of Saint Augustine. On 9 Jan 1499, he was appointed during the papacy of Pope Alexander VI as Auxiliary Bishop of Minden, and Titular Bishop of Paneade. He served as Auxiliary Bishop of Minden until his resignation on 25 Jan 1508.
