= Heinrich von Hattingen =

Most Reverend Heinrich von Hattingen
- Auxiliary Bishop of Minden; Titular Bishop of Lydda
- Church: Catholic Church
- Diocese: Diocese of Minden
- In office: 1515–1519

Personal details
- Died: 1519 Minden, Germany

Heinrich von Hattingen, O. Carm. (died 1519) was a Roman Catholic prelate who served as Auxiliary Bishop of Minden (1515–1519).

== Biography ==
Heinrich von Hattingen was ordained a priest in the Order of the Brothers of the Blessed Virgin Mary of Mount Carmel. On 10 Dec 1515, he was appointed during the papacy of Pope Leo X as Auxiliary Bishop of Minden, and Titular Bishop of Lydda. He served as Auxiliary Bishop of Minden until his death in 1519.
