= Ludwig von Siegen (bishop) =

German Roman Catholic prelate

Most Reverend Ludwig von Siegen
- Auxiliary Bishop of Hildesheim; Auxiliary Bishop of Minden; Titular Bishop of Missene
- Church: Catholic Church
- In office: 1502–1508
- Previous post: Auxiliary Bishop of Minden (1502-1508)

Personal details
- Died: 13 February 1508 Hildesheim, Germany

Ludwig von Siegen, O.F.M. (died 13 February 1508) was a Roman Catholic prelate who served as Auxiliary Bishop of Hildesheim (1502–1508) and Auxiliary Bishop of Minden (1502–1508).

He was ordained a priest in the Order of Friars Minor. On 20 May 1502, he was appointed during the papacy of Pope Alexander VI as Auxiliary Bishop of Hildesheim, Auxiliary Bishop of Minden, and Titular Bishop of Missene. He served as Auxiliary Bishop of Hildesheim and Auxiliary Bishop of Minden until his death on 13 Feb 1508.
