= Josef Homeyer =

German Bishop

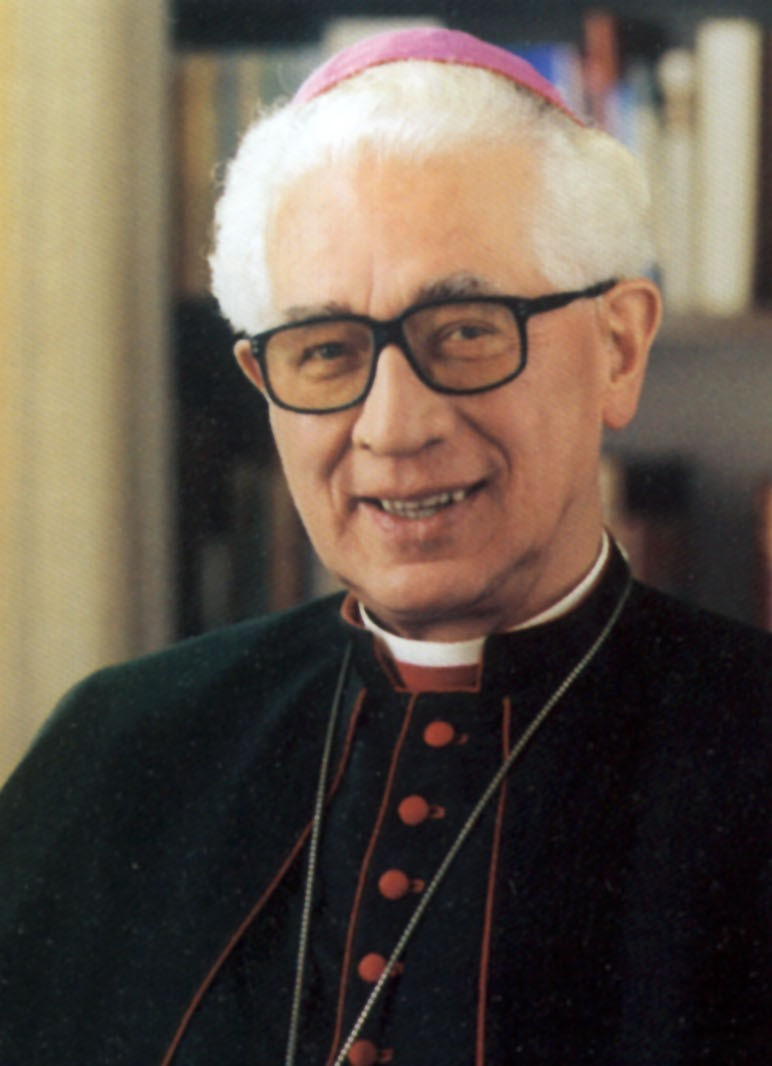
Bishop Josef Homeyer

Coat of arms of Josef Homeyer

Josef Homeyer (1 August 1929 – 30 March 2010) was a German Bishop of the Roman Catholic Diocese of Hildesheim, located in Hildesheim, from his appointment by Pope John Paul II on 25 August 1983 until his retirement on 20 August 2004.

== Biography ==
He was born in Harsewinkel, Münster, North Rhine-Westphalia, Germany. He died in Hildesheim, Germany, on 30 March 2010, at the age of 80.

One of his many activities was to set the foundation of the Forschungsinstitut für Philosophie Hannover in 1988.

In 2005 he got the Honorary citizenship of Hildesheim.

Catholic Church titles
Preceded by Heinrich Maria Janssen	Bishop of Hildesheim; 1983–2004	Vacant Title next held by Norbert Trelle; 2004-2006 sede vacante
