= Emma of Lesum =

German countess

Saint Emma of Lesum
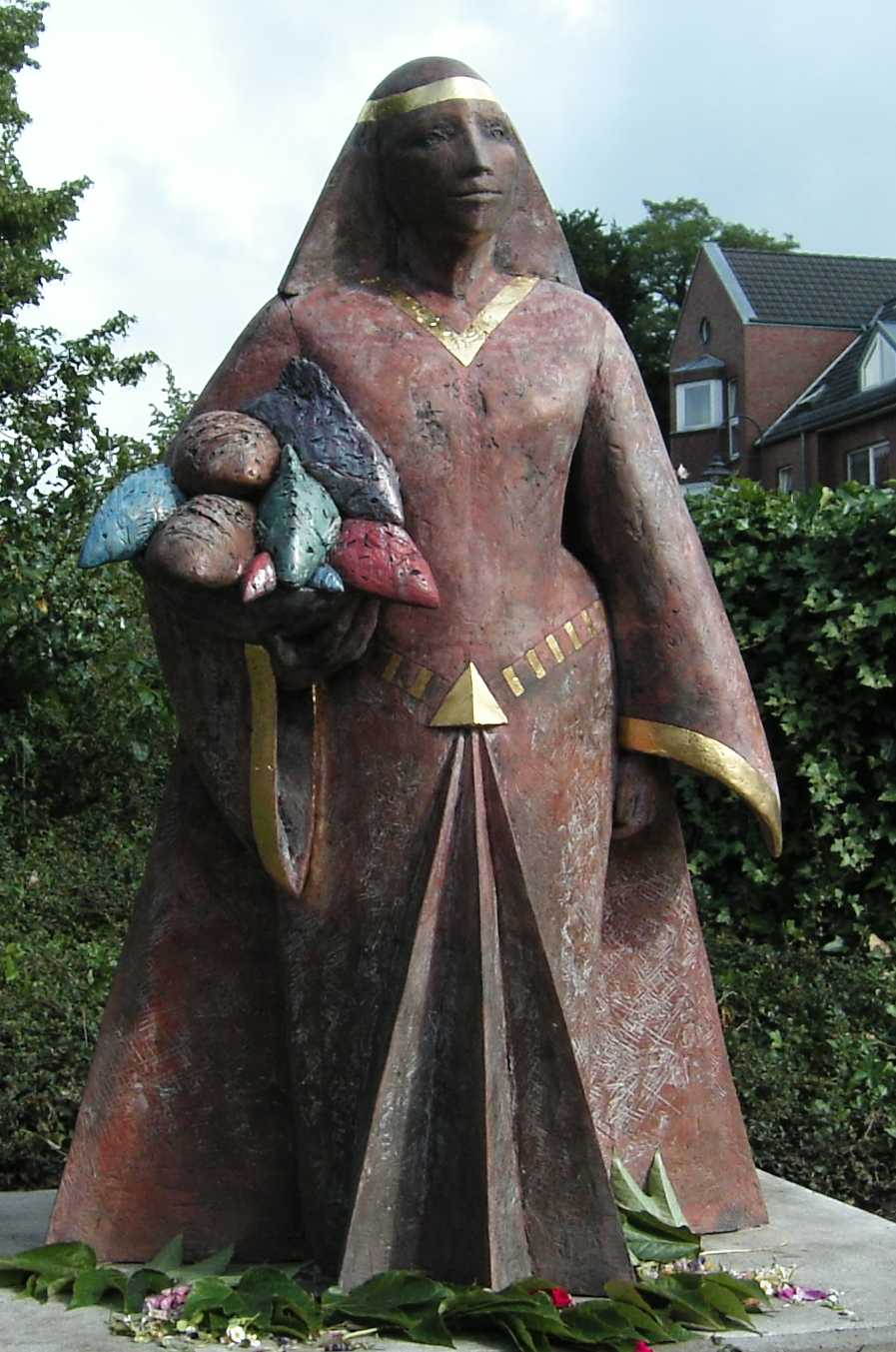
- Statue of Saint Emma of Lesum
- Born: 10th century Duchy of Saxony
- Died: 3 December 1038; Lesum, now Bremen-Burglesum
- Venerated in: Roman Catholicism Eastern Orthodox Church
- Major shrine: Werden Abbey; Bremen Cathedral
- Feast: 19 April or 3 December

Emma of Lesum or Emma of Stiepel (also known as Hemma and Imma) (c. 975-980 – 3 December 1038) was a countess popularly venerated as a saint for her good works. She was married to Liudger of Saxony. She is also the first female inhabitant of Bremen to be known by name.

== See also ==
- List of Catholic saints
- Saint Emma of Lesum, patron saint archive

== Sources ==
- Schwarzwälder, Herbert, 2003: Das Große Bremen-Lexikon. Edition Temmen. ISBN 3-86108-693-X
