= Johannes Tideln =

German Roman Catholic prelate

Most Reverend Johannes Tideln
- Auxiliary Bishop of Hildesheim; Auxiliary Bishop of Minden; Titular Bishop of Missene
- Church: Catholic Church
- In office: 1477–1501
- Previous post: Auxiliary Bishop of Minden (1477–1501)

Personal details
- Died: 28 July 1501 Hildesheim, Germany

Johannes Tideln, O.P. (died 28 Jul 1501) was a Roman Catholic prelate who served as Auxiliary Bishop of Hildesheim (1477–1501) and Auxiliary Bishop of Minden (1477–1501).

== Biography ==
Johannes Tideln was ordained a priest in the Order of Preachers. On 7 Feb 1477, he was appointed during the papacy of Pope Sixtus IV as Auxiliary Bishop of Hildesheim, Auxiliary Bishop of Minden, and Titular Bishop of Missene. He served as Auxiliary Bishop of Hildesheim and Auxiliary Bishop of Minden until his death on 28 Jul 1501 .
