= Johann Christiani von Schleppegrell =

Roman Catholic prelate and auxiliary bishop

Most Reverend Johann Christiani von Schleppegrell
- Auxiliary Bishop of Hildesheim; Auxiliary Bishop of Minden; Auxiliary Bishop of Münster; Titular Bishop of Missene
- Church: Catholic Church
- In office: 1428–1468
- Previous posts: Auxiliary Bishop of Minden (1428–1468); Auxiliary Bishop of Münster (1428–1468).

Personal details
- Born: 1389
- Died: 8 Oct 1468 (age 79) Hildesheim, Germany

Johann Christiani von Schleppegrell, O.S.A. (1389–8 Oct 1468) was a Roman Catholic prelate who served as Auxiliary Bishop of Hildesheim (1428–1468), Auxiliary Bishop of Minden (1428–1468), and Auxiliary Bishop of Münster (1428–1468).

== Biography ==
Christiani von Schleppegrell was born in 1389 and ordained a priest in the Order of Saint Augustine. On 7 Jun 1428, he was appointed during the papacy of Pope Martin V as Auxiliary Bishop of Hildesheim, Auxiliary Bishop of Münster, Auxiliary Bishop of Minden, and Titular Bishop of Missene. He served as Auxiliary Bishop of Hildesheim until his death on 8 Oct 1468.
