= Milo of Minden =

Milo of Minden (died c. 996) was the bishop of Minden from 969 to 996.

== Life ==
Milo was appointed as the bishop of Minden by Otto II., probably after being a canon in Cologne.

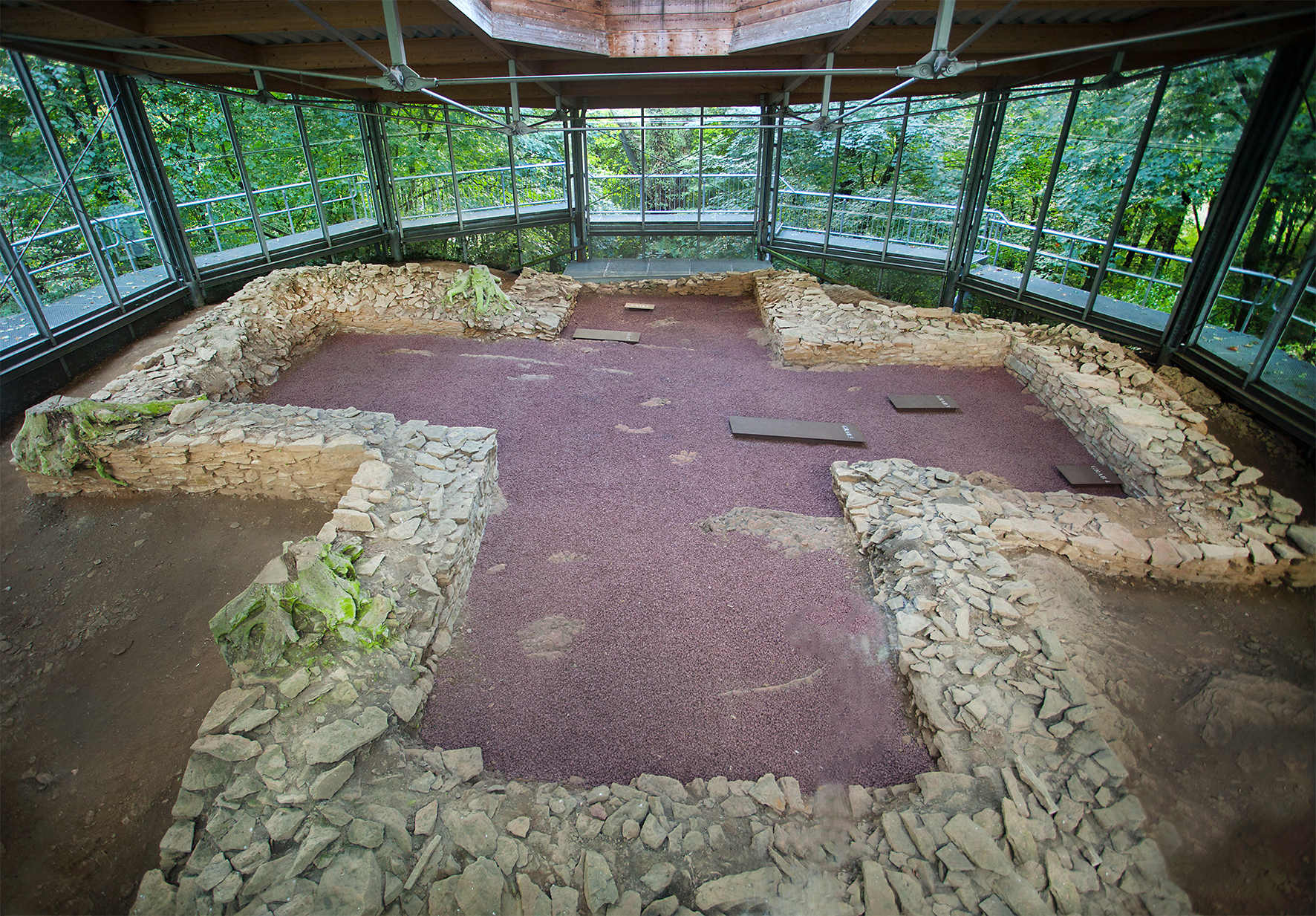
The Kreuzkirche on the Wittekindsberg (Wiehen Hills) was probably built by him

In 991 he took part in the campaign of Bernard I, Duke of Saxony against the Slavs.
