= Diocese of Hildesheim =

Latin Catholic ecclesiastical jurisdiction in Germany

Coordinates: 52.1489°N 9.9465°E

Diocese of Hildesheim Dioecesis Hildesiensis Bistum Hildesheim

Catholic
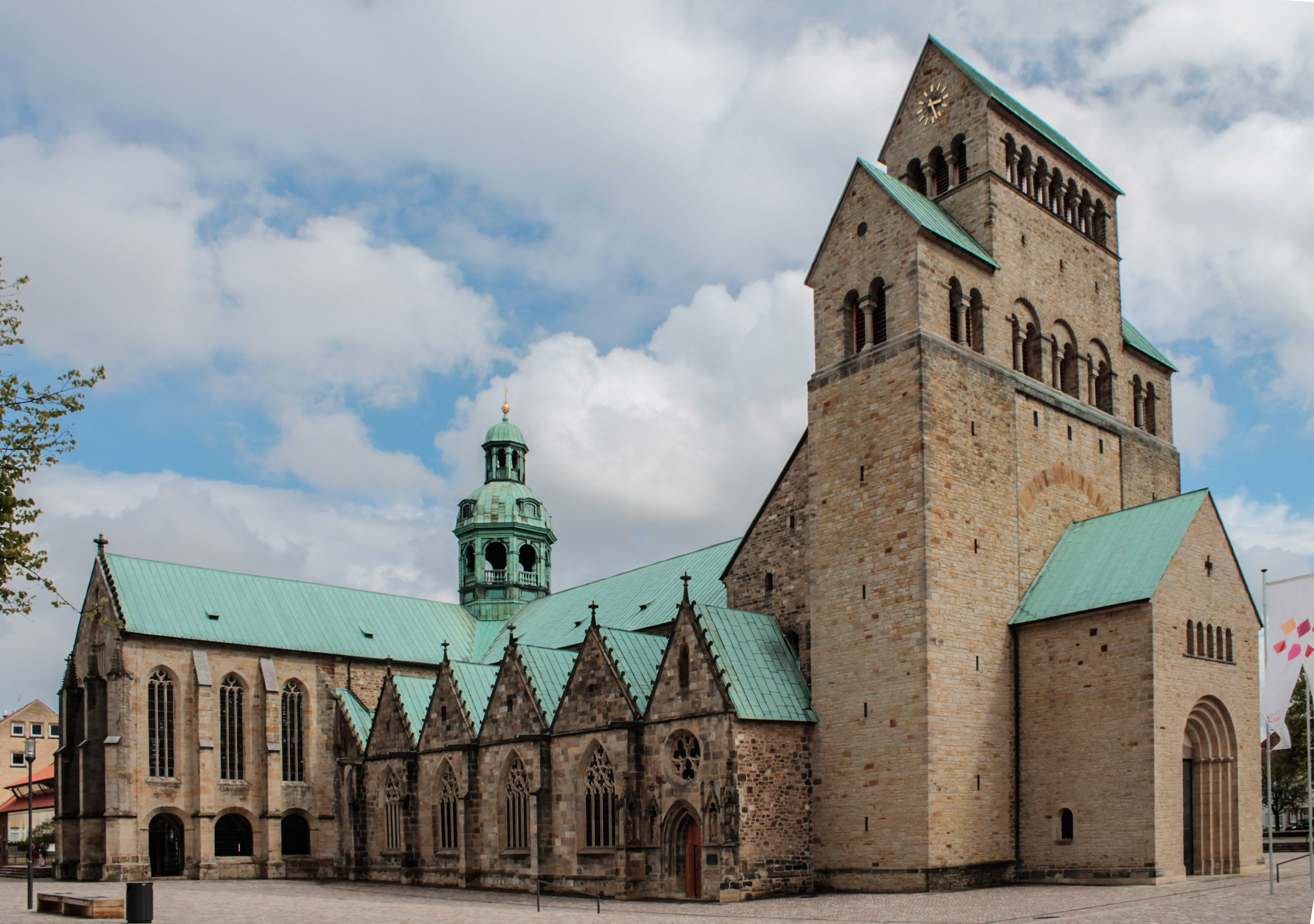
- St. Mary's Cathedral, Hildesheim

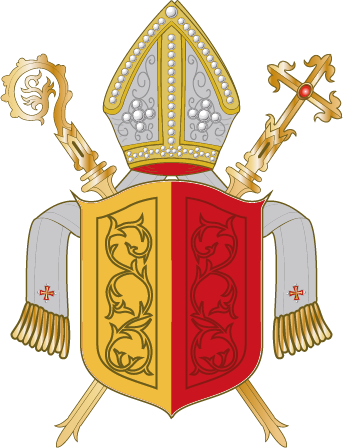
- Coat of arms

Location
- Country: Germany
- Territory: Hildesheim, Lower Saxony
- Ecclesiastical province: Hamburg

Statistics
- Area: 30,000 km^{2} (12,000 sq mi)
- Population: Total; Catholics: (as of 2013); 5,349,318; 616,210 (11.5%)

Information
- Denomination: Catholic Church
- Sui iuris church: Latin Church
- Rite: Roman Rite
- Established: 815
- Cathedral: St. Mary's Cathedral
- Patron saint: St. Godehard; Mary, Mother of God

Current leadership
- Pope: Leo XIV
- Bishop: Vacant
- Metropolitan Archbishop: Stefan Heße
- Auxiliary Bishops: Hans-Georg Koitz (emeritus), Nikolaus Schwerdtfeger, Heinz-Günter Bongartz

Map
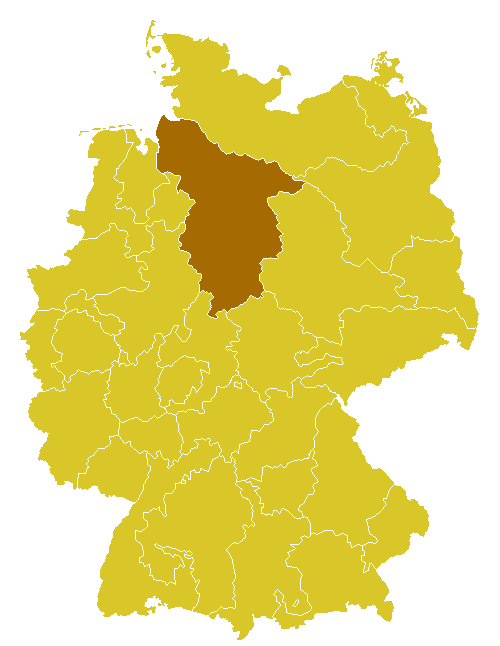

Website
- bistum-hildesheim.de

The Diocese of Hildesheim (Latin: Dioecesis Hildesiensis) is a Latin Church diocese of the Catholic Church in Germany. Founded in 815 as a missionary diocese by King Louis the Pious, his son Louis the German appointed the famous former archbishop of Rheims, Ebbo, as bishop.

The modern Diocese of Hildesheim presently covers those parts of the state of Lower Saxony that are east of the River Weser, northern neighborhoods in Bremen, and the city of Bremerhaven.

The diocese has been a suffragan to the Archdiocese of Hamburg since 1994. Originally, Hildesheim was suffragan to Mainz until 1805. Then it was an exempt diocese until 1930, before it was part of the Middle German Ecclesiastical Province with Paderborn Archdiocese as metropolitan between 1930 and 1994.

== Prince-bishopric ==
Between 1235 and 1802, the bishop of Hildesheim was also Prince of the Holy Roman Empire. His Hochstift (feudal princely territory) was the Prince-Bishopric of Hildesheim. In the 16th century, most of the diocese as well as most of the state of Hildesheim switched to Protestantism, but the bishopric managed to retain its independence from the surrounding Protestant states of Brunswick-Lüneburg, mostly because its bishops were members of the powerful House of Wittelsbach from 1573 until 1761.

== Diocesan ambit ==
Until 1824 the diocesan ambit remained unchanged, despite various changes of the political borders in history up to this date. After the Napoleonic wars the newly established Kingdom of Hanover stipulated with the Holy See to extend the Hildesheim diocesan ambit to all of the then Hanoverian territory east of the Weser river. The newly included areas were Lutheran with a little Catholic diaspora and had formed part of the defunct dioceses of Bremen, of Mainz and of Verden before the Reformation.

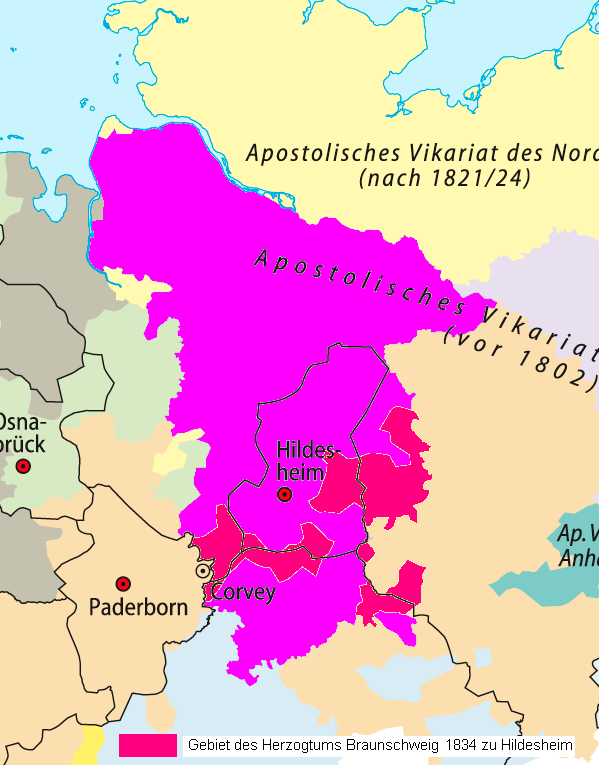
Hildesheim diocese: The ambit until 1824 (black rimmed), after extension of 1824 (in magenta), and after inclusion of Brunswick in 1834 (in red and magenta)

Hannover's cession of land for Bremerhaven in 1827 to the prevailingly Reformed Bremen State did not alter the diocesan ambit. In 1834 the prevailingly Lutheran Duchy of Brunswick left the Apostolic Vicariate of Anhalt and agreed to extend Hildesheim's ambit to the ducal territory. Thus the diocese covered areas in three sovereign states, with all of which and thus all the diocesan area becoming part of united Germany in 1871.

The incorporation of Hanoverian suburbs into Bremen city (Bremen North borough) in 1939 did not alter the ambit. In 1965 Hildesheim ceded that part of the then Hoya County District east of the Weser to the diocese of Osnabrück, whereas Osnabrück in return ceded Cuxhaven, Neuwerk, Scharhörn, Schaumburg-Lippe, as well as parts of the districts of Verden, Holzminden, Hameln-Pyrmont located west of the Weser, and the quarters of Nienburg upon Weser west of the river to Hildesheim. In 1995 Hildesheim ceded its Harburg deanery in Hamburg south of the Elbe to the Archdiocese of Hamburg following the erection of this new see.

== Episcopal ordinaries ==
- Dietmar (20 August 1038 Ordained Bishop – 14 November 1044 Died)
- Magnus Herzog von Sachsen-Lauenburg (12 May 1424 Succeeded – 20 May 1452 Resigned)
- Bernhard Herzog von Braunschweig-Lüneburg (20 May 1452 Appointed – 1458 Resigned)
- Ernst Graf von Schaumberg (1458 Appointed – 22 July 1471 Died)
- Henning von Haus (29 September 1471 Appointed – November 1480 Resigned)
- Berthold II of Landsberg (1481 Appointed – 4 May 1502 Died)
- Erich Herzog von Sachsen-Lauenburg (2 December 1502 Confirmed – 1504 Resigned)
- John IV of Saxe-Lauenburg (12 July 1503 Appointed – 6 May 1527 Resigned)
- Balthasar Merklin (6 May 1527 Appointed – 28 May 1531 Died)
- Otto Graf von Schaumberg (28 July 1531 Appointed – 22 December 1576 Died)
- Valentin von Tetleben (30 September 1537 Appointed – 19 April 1551 Died)
- Friedrich Herzog von Schleswig-Holstein (3 October 1551 Appointed – 27 October 1556 Died)
- Burchard Oberg (31 March 1557 Appointed – 23 February 1573 Died)
- Ernst Herzog von Bayern (7 March 1573 Appointed – 17 February 1612 Died)
- Ferdinand Herzog von Bayern (17 February 1612 Succeeded – 13 September 1650 Died)
- Max Heinrich Herzog von Bayern (13 September 1650 Succeeded – 3 June 1688 Died)
- Jobst Edmund Freiherr von Brabeck (19 July 1688 Appointed – 13 August 1702 Died)
- Joseph Clemens Kajetan Herzog von Bayern (1714 Succeeded – 11 December 1723 Died)
- Clemens August Maria Herzog von Bayern (5 February 1724 Appointed – 6 February 1761 Died)
- Friedrich Wilhelm Freiherr von Westphalen (7 February 1763 Appointed – 6 January 1789 Died)
- Franz Egon Freiherr von Fürstenberg (6 January 1789 Succeeded – 11 August 1825 Died)
- Karl Klemens Reichsfreiherr von Gruben (11 August 1825 Appointed – 4 July 1827 Died)
- Godehard Joseph Osthaus (26 March 1829 Appointed – 30 December 1835 Died)
- Franz Ferdinand (Johann Franz) Fritz, O.S.B. (10 March 1836 Appointed – 6 September 1840 Died)
- Jakob Joseph Wandt (9 December 1841 Appointed – 16 October 1849 Died)
- Eduard Jakob Wedekin (27 November 1849 Appointed – 25 December 1870 Died)
- Daniel Wilhelm Sommerwerk (Jacobi) (13 April 1871 Appointed – 18 December 1905 Died)
- Adolf Bertram (26 April 1906 Appointed – 25 May 1914 Appointed, Archbishop of Breslau (Wrocław))
- Joseph Ernst (10 February 1915 Appointed – 5 May 1928 Died)
- Nikolaus Bares (15 January 1929 Appointed – 27 October 1933 Appointed, Bishop of Berlin)
- Joseph Godehard Machens (22 June 1934 Appointed – 14 August 1956 Died)
- Heinrich Maria Janssen (3 February 1957 Appointed – 28 December 1983 Retired)
- Josef Homeyer (25 August 1983 Appointed – 20 August 2004 Retired)
- Norbert Trelle (29 November 2005 Appointed – 9 September 2017 Retired)
- Heiner Wilmer (7 April 2018 Appointed – 26 March 2026)
