= Minden Cathedral =

- The Cathedral of Ss. Gorgonius and Peter
- Mindener Dom
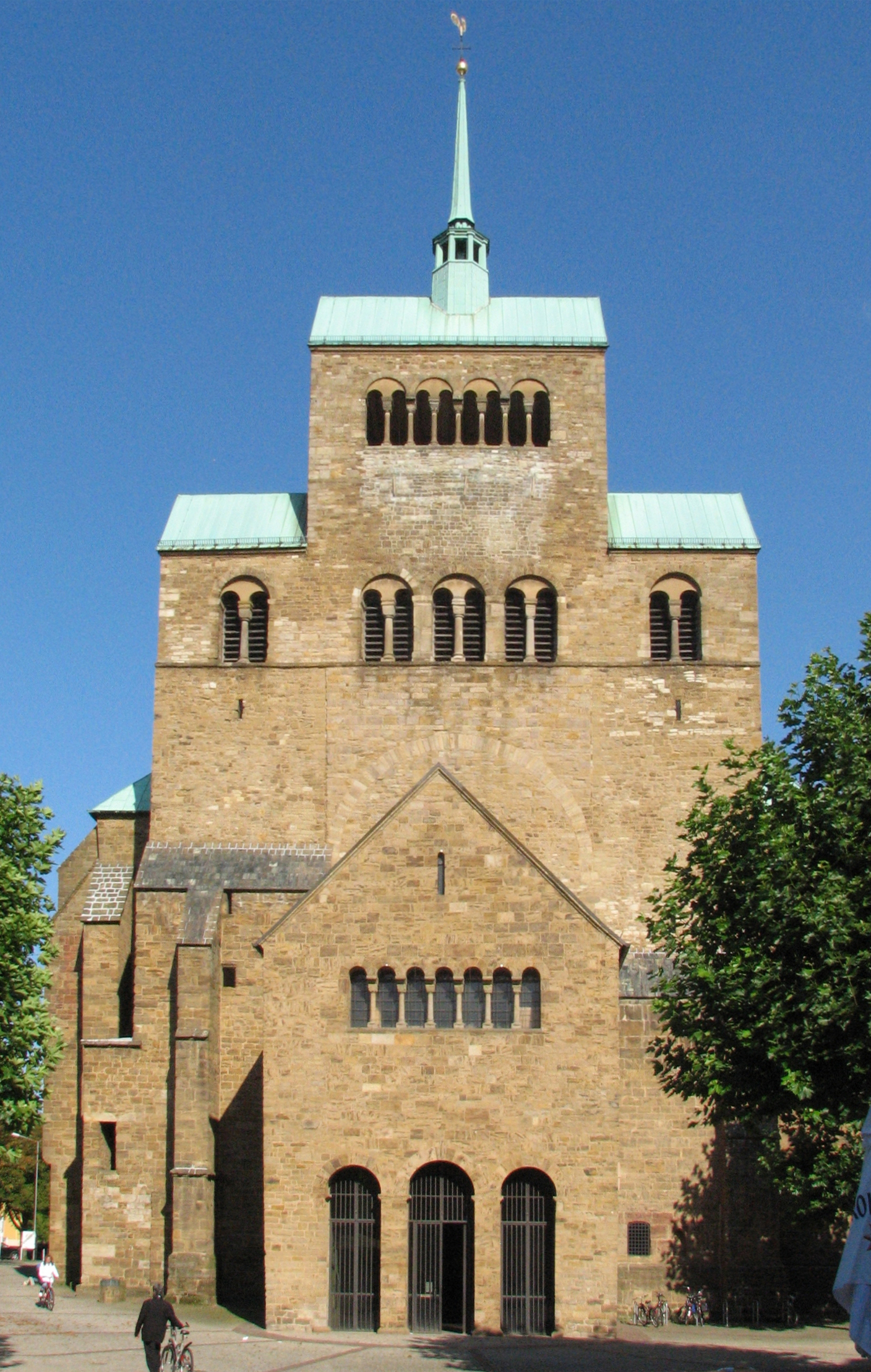
- The cathedral from the west side
- Minden Cathedral
- 52°17′20″N 8°55′09″E
- Location: Minden, Germany
- Denomination: Roman Catholic
- Website: Website of the Cathedral

History
- Status: Active
- Dedication: Gorgonius; Saint Peter

Architecture
- Functional status: parish Church
- Style: Romanesque (original & westwork); Gothic
- Groundbreaking: 803

Specifications
- Length: 91 m (298 ft 7 in)
- Width: 39 m (127 ft 11 in)
- Height: 11 m (36 ft 1 in)

Administration
- Diocese: Archdiocese of Paderborn

Minden Cathedral, dedicated to Saints Gorgonius and Peter, is a Roman Catholic church in the city of Minden, North Rhine-Westphalia, Germany. From the year 803 AD, when the area was conquered by Charlemagne, Minden was the center of a diocese and subsequently became the center of a small sovereign state, a prince-bishopric (Hochstift) of Minden, until the time of the Peace of Westphalia (1648), when Minden was secularized as the Principality of Minden (which lasted until 1806).

Despite the whole principality became a protestant region, the cathedral remained Catholic, and the Cathedral chapter consisted of Catholic and Protestant members until it was abolished in 1810. Today the church belongs to the archdiocese of Paderborn.

== History ==
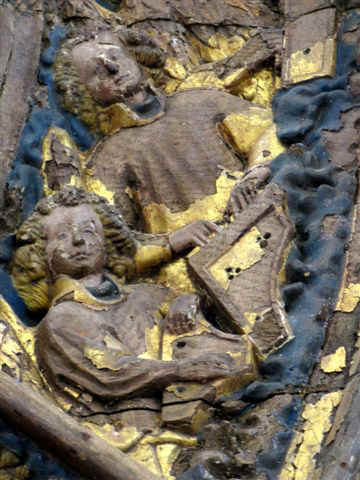
Altarpiece (1425) of the Minden cathedral: angels play a harpsichord and a psaltery

Over the course of many centuries, the cathedral grew from a simple Carolingian church to a monumental basilica. The High Gothic nave and its large tracery windows inspired a number of other buildings. During World War II, the church was almost completely destroyed by an aerial bombing conducted by US Army Air Force B17s on 28 March 1945. This almost completely destroyed the town center including the town hall and cathedral and resulted in the death of over 180 people.

The church was rebuilt in the 1950s by architect Werner March. The church contains a number of valuable art treasures.

== Patronage ==
From Rome in the 8th century the remains of St. Gorgonius were translated by Saint Chrodegang, Bishop of Metz to the monastery of Gorze in Lorraine. Some of the relics were later translated to Minden Cathedral.
