= Prince-Bishopric of Minden =

Principality of Holy Roman Empire

Prince-Bishopric of Minden Hochstift Minden (German)
- 1180–1648
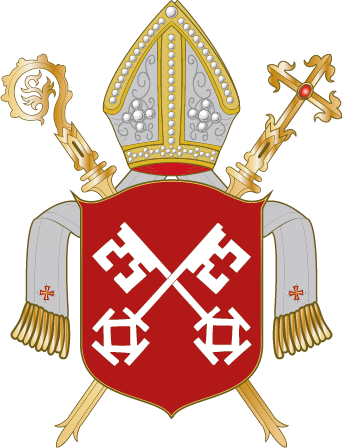
- Coat of arms

- Map of part of the Lower Rhenish–Westphalian Circle in 1560, Prince-Bishopric of Minden highlighted in red
- Status: Prince-Bishopric
- Capital: Minden
- Common languages: Northern Low Saxon
- Government: Ecclesiastical principality
- Historical era: Middle Ages
  - Founded by Charlemagne: 803
  - Gained Reichsfreiheit: 1180
  - Possessed Hamelin: 1259–77
  - Peace of Westphalia: Secularised to Brandenburg-Prussia: 1648
  - Ceded to Westphalia: 1807–14
Preceded by	Succeeded by
Duchy of Saxony	Margraviate of Brandenburg

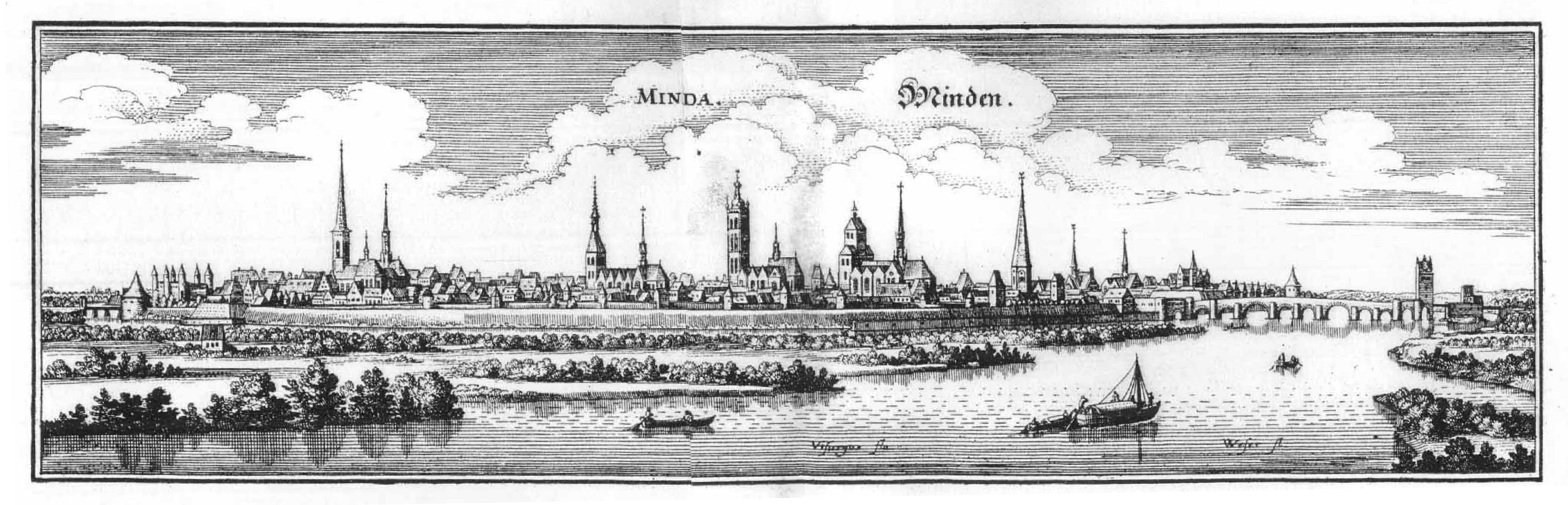
Historic view of Minden around 1647

The Prince-Bishopric of Minden (German: Fürstbistum Minden; Bistum Minden; Hochstift Minden; Stift Minden) was an ecclesiastical principality of the Holy Roman Empire. It was progressively secularized following the Protestant Reformation when it came under the rule of Protestant rulers, and by the Peace of Westphalia of 1648 given to Brandenburg as the Principality of Minden. It must not be confused with the Catholic Diocese of Minden, which was larger, and over which the prince-bishop exercised spiritual authority.

== History ==
The diocese was founded by Charlemagne in 803, after he had conquered the Saxons. It was subordinate to the Archbishopric-Electorate of Cologne.

It became the Prince-Bishopric of Minden (German: Fürstbistum Minden) in 1180, when the Duchy of Saxony was dissolved.

As to the diocese of Minden, it ceased to exist following the Swedish takeover of 1648.

Prior to its dissolution, the diocesan area comprised, in addition to the temporal prince-bishopric, parts of Brunswick-Wolfenbüttel and all of Schaumburg-Lippe. The defunct diocese came under the care of by the Apostolic Vicariate of the Nordic Missions in 1667. Between 1709 and 1780 it formed part of the Vicariate Apostolic of Upper and Lower Saxony, before it was reincorporated into the Nordic Missions. In 1821 the former Minden diocesan area within the former prince-bishopric boundary became part of the Diocese of Paderborn, whereas the Brunswickian part became part of the Apostolic Vicariate of Anhalt and Brunswick in 1825, only to join the Diocese of Hildesheim in 1834. The Schaumburg-Lippe area stayed with the Nordic Missions until their dissolution in 1930, becoming first part of the Diocese of Osnabrück and then of Hildesheim as of 1965.

=== Transition to a secular principality ===
In the 16th century, the Protestant Reformation was starting to take hold in the state, under the influence of the Duchy of Brunswick-Lüneburg. Minden was occupied by Sweden in the Thirty Years' War, and secularized. The Peace of Westphalia of 1648 gave it to the Margraviate of Brandenburg as the Principality of Minden (German: Fürstentum Minden).

After 1719 Minden was administered by Brandenburg-Prussia together with the adjacent County of Ravensberg as Minden-Ravensberg. In 1807, it became part of the Kingdom of Westphalia. In 1814, it returned to Prussia and became part of the Province of Westphalia.

As of 1789, the principality had an area of 1,100 km^{2} (420 sq mi). It was bordered by (clockwise from the north): an exclave of the Landgraviate of Hesse-Kassel (or Hesse-Cassel), the Electorate of Hanover, the County of Schaumburg-Lippe, another exclave of Hesse-Kassel, the Principality of Lippe, the County of Ravensberg, and the Prince-Bishopric of Osnabrück. Cities included Minden and Lübbecke.

== Famous bishops ==
- Saint Erkanbert (803–813)
- Saint Hardward (813–853)
- Saint Theoderich (853–880)
- Saint Thietmar (1185–1206)
- Francis of Waldeck (1530–53)
- Julius, Duke of Brunswick-Lüneburg (1553–54)
- Henry Julius, Duke of Brunswick-Lüneburg (1582–85, Protestant)
- Christian the Elder, Duke of Brunswick-Lüneburg (1599–1625, Protestant)
- Francis of Wartenberg (1631–48)

== Auxiliary bishops ==
- Johann Christiani von Schleppegrell, O.S.A. (1428–1468)
- Johannes Tideln, O.P. (1477–1501)
- Johannes Gropengeter, O.S.A. (1499–1508)
- Ludwig von Siegen, O.F.M. (1502–1508)
- Heinrich von Hattingen, O. Carm. (1515–1519)

== See also ==
- Ostwestfalen-Lippe
