= Bassen, Lower Saxony =

Bassen
- Ortsteil of Oyten
- Interactive map of Bassen
- Location within Germany Location within Lower Saxony
- Coordinates: 53°04′N 09°05′E
- Country: Germany
- State: Lower Saxony
- District: Verden
- Municipality: Oyten
- Elevation: 15 m (49 ft)

Population (2016)
  - Total: 3,318
- Time zone: UTC+01:00 (CET)
  - Summer (DST): UTC+02:00 (CEST)

Bassen is a district and a village in the municipality Oyten in Lower Saxony. The place is about 20 km east of the city center of Bremen and about 100 km southwest of Hamburg. In the northern area the Wümme flows through Bassen. It has 3,318 inhabitants (2016).

== History ==
On July 1, 1972, Bassen was incorporated into the neighboring municipality of Oyten.

== Traffic ==
The Lower Saxony state roads L 156 and L 168 run through the village. In addition, the local area of Bassen is cut through by the Bundesautobahn 1 Hamburg – Bremen and the Hamburg – Bremen railway line.

== Neighboring places ==
Bassen borders to the Places Fischerhude, Ottersberg, Posthausen, Achim (Weser) and Oyten.

== Residents ==
The Recent population is 3318 (State: June 30, 2016). This makes Bassen the district with the second highest proportion of inhabitants in the municipality of Oyten. By designating new development areas, however, this number could increase even further in the future.

== Infrastructure and economy ==
There is a communal kindergarten and a primary school in the village of Bassen.

The kindergarten, which was redesigned and expanded to its current form in 2000 and 2012, is located in the immediate vicinity of the primary school, the sports fields and the sports halls are used by both places.

The Primary school of Bassen has at the time eight classes of the Grade levels 1 to 4.

The economy is characterized by craft businesses and agriculture.

== Local life ==
Local life is shaped, among other things, by the clubs. In addition to the Bassen volunteer fire department, the gymnastics and sports club “Gut Heil” Bassen and the Kyffhäuser Comradeship Bassen, the village community association Blocks Huus e.V. has been established since 2001.

Blocks Huus is a completely renovated former farmyard that has been converted into a multifunctional building for the village community. Various festivities, exhibitions, youth work and other events take place there. In May 2009 a village museum was opened there.

The Bassener Stammtisch Club 22 organizes special activities. The successful “public viewing” after the 2006 soccer world championship and 2008 European championship in Bassen has become a permanent feature of the event with a large audience. Even NDR television reported it live. Club 22 is also bringing special concerts to Bassen in the barn of Blocks Huus, for example in 2007 by the cult band Torfrock with the opening act Ohrfeindt.

Festivities in the village are the Easter fire (Holy Saturday), the Christmas market (1st Advent) and the traditional four-day harvest festival with its parade of the harvest wagons (1st weekend in September), which is also known beyond the borders of Bassen. For this purpose, there are usually over 50 harvest wagons from the near and far to a several kilometer long move.

In 2009 the village of Bassen celebrated its 750th anniversary with many different events.

In 2014 TSV Bassen celebrated its 100th anniversary with many different campaigns and events.

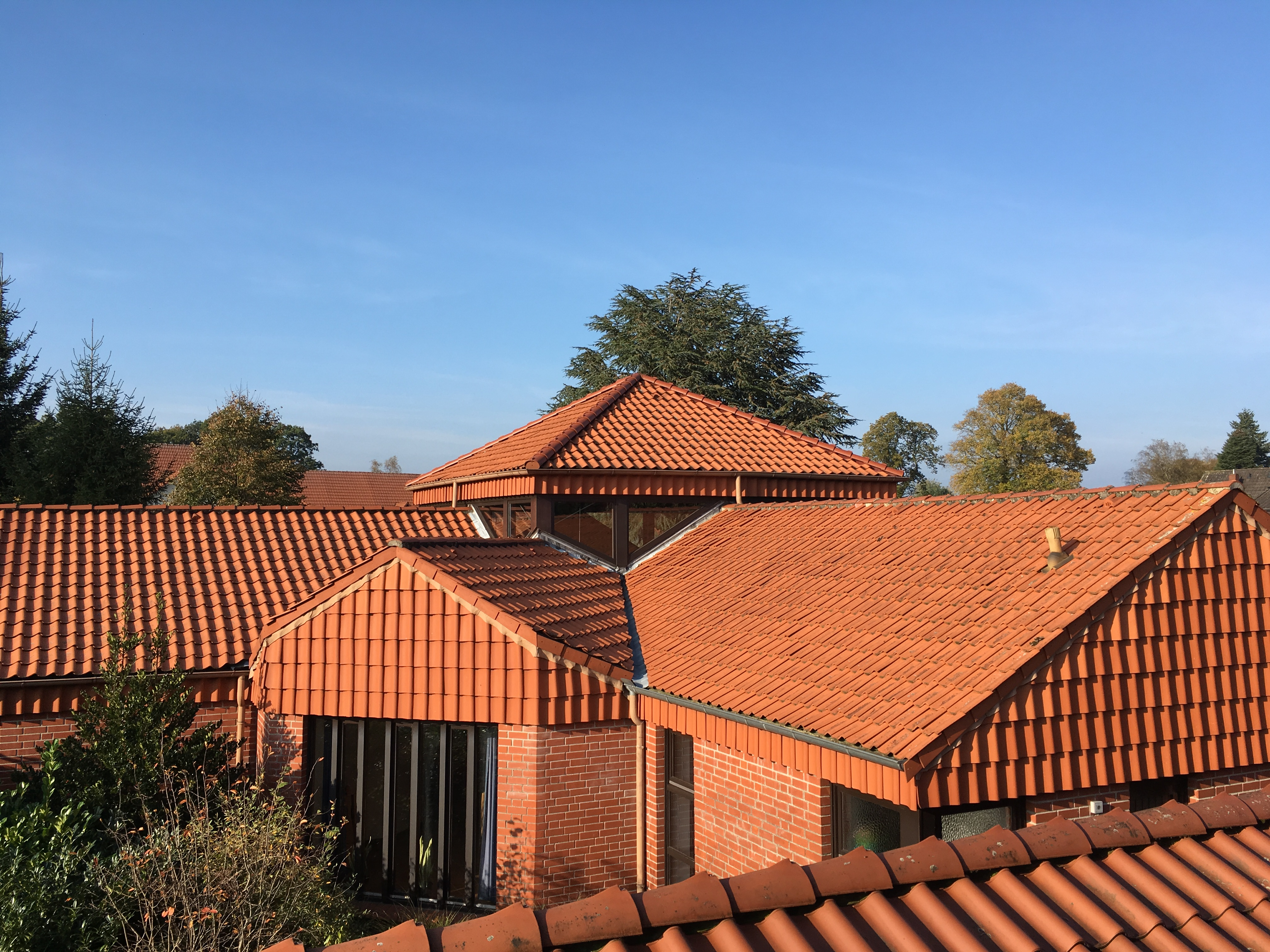
The roof of the Bassen community center (built in 1982) is an architectural highlight

The non-profit sponsoring association "Gemeindezentrum Bassen e.V.", who is responsible for the preservation of the Bassen community center of the ev.-luth. St. Petri parish in Oyten was founded on January 25, 2018. In addition to the continuation of the church services and the use of the building as a cemetery chapel, other uses will take place in the future. The "Bassen family room" has already been rented with various programs and offers for the whole family.
