= Achim Synagogue =

Coordinates: 53°00′48″N 9°01′53″E

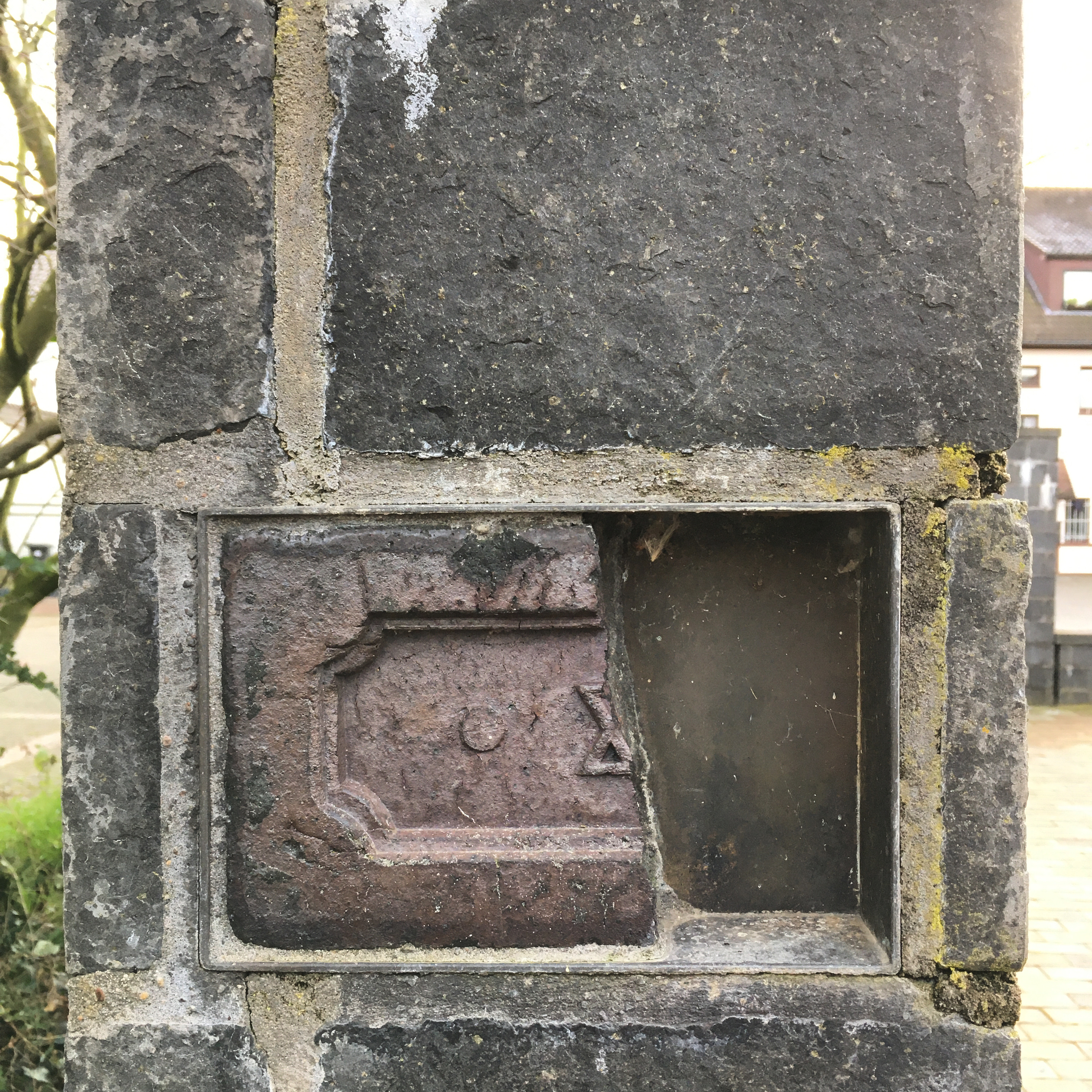
Broken-off Star of David on the memorial

The synagogue in Achim, a town in the Verden district in Lower Saxony, was built in 1864 or 1874 and destroyed in 1938.

== History ==
The synagogue was endowed by Elias Moses Alexander and stood on his private property. It resembled a residential house.

During the November Pogrom of 1938, the interior furnishings were smashed and burned in front of the building. The synagogue building itself was not set on fire, as it was feared the fire could spread to neighboring houses. The house of worship was sold a short time later and served as a storage facility for paint. The synagogue was finally demolished in 1987.

== Memorial ==
At the site of the destroyed synagogue, at the corner of Synagogenweg and Anspacherstraße, a memorial has stood since 1990 bearing the following inscription: "In memory of our Jewish fellow citizens and of the synagogue that stood here. On November 9 it was wantonly destroyed. Forgetting leads into exile. Remembering, however, is the secret of liberation".

== See also ==
- Jewish Cemetery, Achim
