= Oyten =

- Municipality
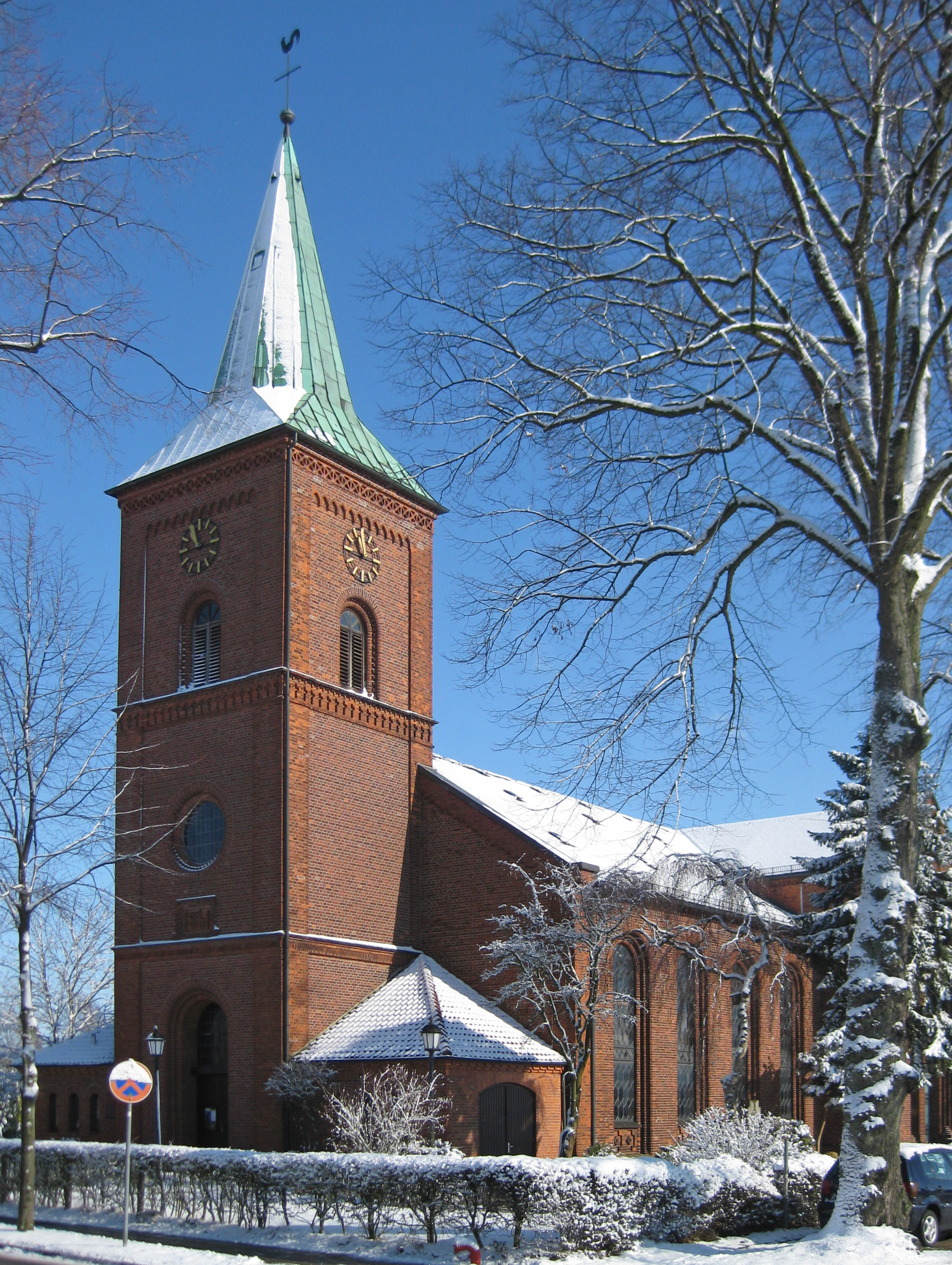
- Church of Saint Peter

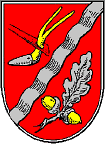
- Coat of arms

- Location of Oyten within Verden district
- Interactive map of Oyten
- Location within Germany Location within Lower Saxony
- Coordinates: 53°3′40″N 9°1′4″E
- Country: Germany
- State: Lower Saxony
- District: Verden

Government
  - Mayor (2019–24): Sandra Röse (CDU)

Area
  - Total: 63.43 km^{2} (24.49 sq mi)
- Elevation: 15 m (49 ft)

Population (2025-12-31)
  - Total: 16,509
  - Density: 260.3/km^{2} (674.1/sq mi)
- Time zone: UTC+01:00 (CET)
  - Summer (DST): UTC+02:00 (CEST)
- Postal codes: 28876
- Dialling codes: 04207
- Vehicle registration: VER
- Website: www.oyten.de

Oyten (German pronunciation: [ˈɔʏtn̩]; Low German: Eiten) is a municipality in the district of Verden, in Lower Saxony, Germany. It is situated approximately 20 km northwest of Verden, and 15 km east of Bremen. Oyten is made up of eight neighborhoods: Oyten-South, Bassen, Oyten-North, Sagehorn, Bockhorst, Shaphusen, Meyerdamm, and Oyterdamm.

Oyten belonged to the Prince-Archbishopric of Bremen, established in 1180. In 1648 the Prince-Archbishopric was transformed into the Duchy of Bremen, which was first ruled in personal union by the Swedish Crown – interrupted by a Danish occupation (1712–1715) – and from 1715 on by the Hanoverian Crown. In 1807 the ephemeric Kingdom of Westphalia annexed the Duchy, before France annexed it in 1810. In 1813 the Duchy was restored to the Electorate of Hanover, which – after its upgrade to the Kingdom of Hanover in 1814 – incorporated the Duchy in a real union and the Ducal territory, including Oyten, became part of the new Stade Region, established in 1823.

== Cities near Oyten ==
- Bremen
- Achim
- Fischerhude
- Ottersberg
- Sagehorn
