= Otterstedt =

Coordinates: 53°09′N 9°09′E

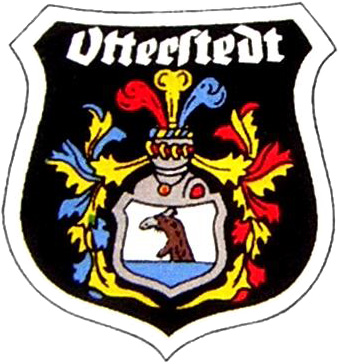
Otterstedt coat of arms

Otterstedt is a village in the district of Verden, in Lower Saxony, Germany. It is part of the municipality of Ottersberg.

It is notable for the nearby lake Otterstedter See, which is a local resort. The lake was formed around 12,000 years ago at the retreat of the glacial ice. It has an area of 4.5 ha and a maximum depth of 11 m.
