= Thedinghausen =

- Municipality
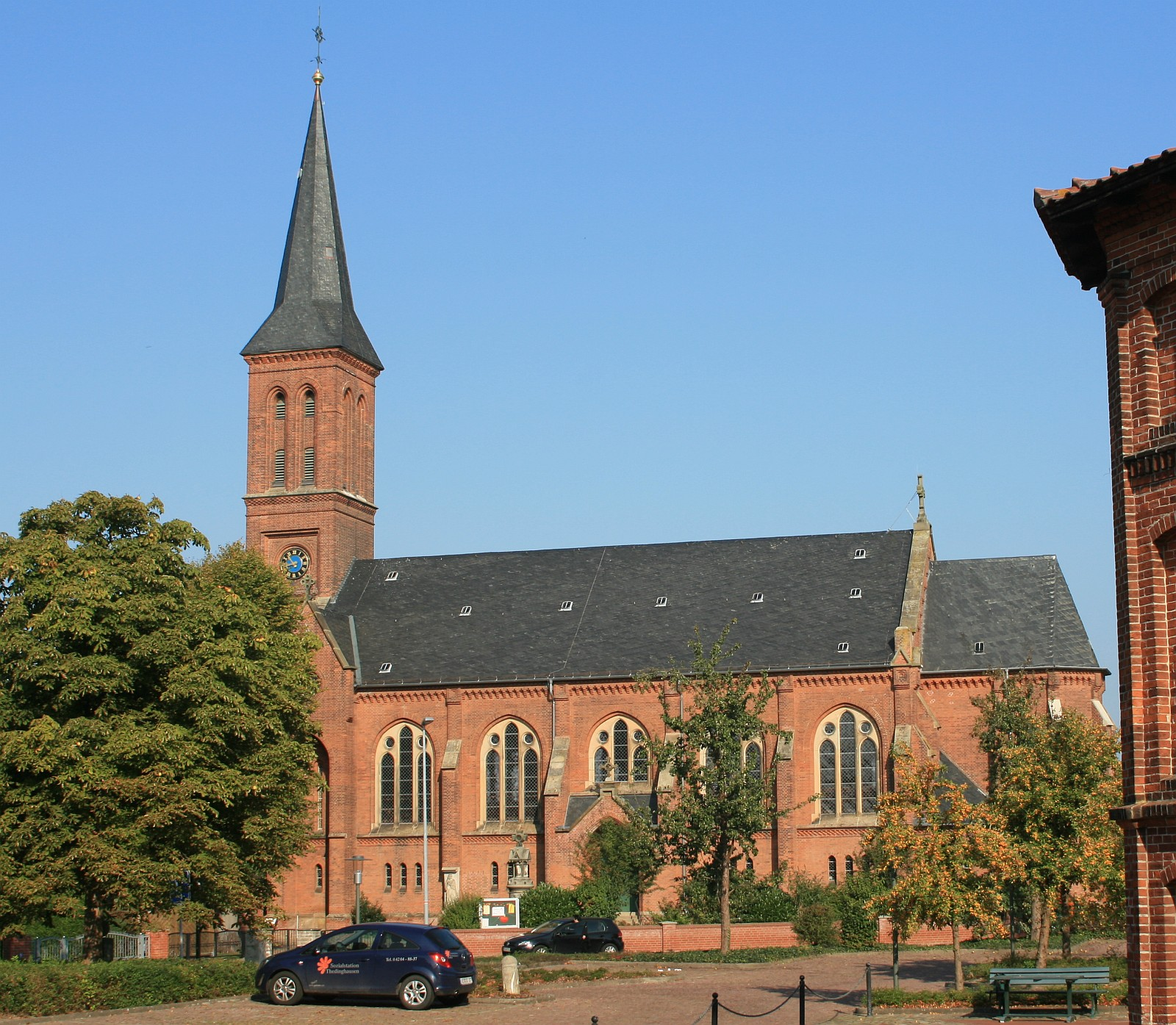
- Maria Magdalena Church

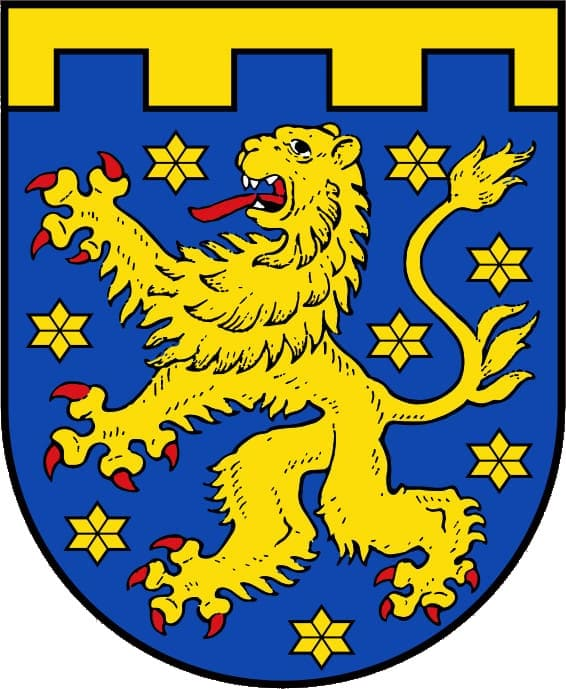
- Coat of arms

- Location of Thedinghausen within Verden district
- Interactive map of Thedinghausen
- Location within Germany Location within Lower Saxony
- Coordinates: 52°57′44″N 09°01′15″E
- Country: Germany
- State: Lower Saxony
- District: Verden
- Municipal assoc.: Thedinghausen
- Subdivisions: 12 Ortsteile

Government
  - Mayor: Diethelm Ehlers (SPD)

Area
  - Total: 65.79 km^{2} (25.40 sq mi)
- Elevation: 13 m (43 ft)

Population (2025-12-31)
  - Total: 8,144
  - Density: 123.8/km^{2} (320.6/sq mi)
- Time zone: UTC+01:00 (CET)
  - Summer (DST): UTC+02:00 (CEST)
- Postal codes: 27319–27321
- Dialling codes: 04204
- Vehicle registration: VER
- Website: www.thedinghausen.de

Thedinghausen (German pronunciation: [teːdɪŋˈhaʊzn̩]; Low German: Thänhusen or Theenhusen) is a municipality in the district of Verden, in Lower Saxony, Germany. It is situated on the left bank of the Weser, approx. 15 km west of Verden, and 20 km southeast of Bremen.

Thedinghausen is also the seat of the Samtgemeinde ("collective municipality") Thedinghausen.

It was an exclave of Braunschweig until 1972.
