= Helmstedt – Wolfsburg =

Federal electoral district of Germany

51 Helmstedt – Wolfsburg
- Electoral district for the Bundestag
- Helmstedt – Wolfsburg in 2025
- State: Lower Saxony
- Population: 242,200 (2019)
- Electorate: 180,147 (2021)
- Major settlements: Wolfsburg; Helmstedt
- Area: 1,165.2 km^{2}

Current electoral district
- Created: 1949
- Party: CDU
- Member: Alexander Jordan
- Elected: 2025

Helmstedt – Wolfsburg is an electoral constituency (German: Wahlkreis) represented in the Bundestag. It elects one member via first-past-the-post voting. Under the current constituency numbering system, it is designated as constituency 51. It is located in southeastern Lower Saxony, comprising the city of Wolfsburg, the district of Helmstedt, and part of the district of Gifhorn.

Helmstedt – Wolfsburg was created for the inaugural 1949 federal election. Since 2017, it has been represented by Falko Mohrs of the Social Democratic Party (SPD). Mohrs resigned in 2022, to join the Second Weil cabinet. Since 2025 it is represented by Alexander Jordan of the Christian Democratic Union of Germany.

== Geography ==
Helmstedt – Wolfsburg is located in southeastern Lower Saxony. As of the 2021 federal election, it comprises the independent city of Wolfsburg, the district of Helmstedt, and the Samtgemeinden of Boldecker Land and Brome and the Giebel area from the Gifhorn district.

== History ==
Helmstedt – Wolfsburg was created in 1949, then known as Braunschweig-Land – Helmstedt. It acquired its current name in the 1965 election. In the inaugural Bundestag election, it was Lower Saxony constituency 29 in the numbering system. From 1953 through 1961, it was number 51. From 1965 through 1998, it was number 46. In the 2002 and 2005 elections, it was number 51. In the 2009 election, it was number 52. Since the 2013 election, it has been number 51.

Originally, the constituency comprised the district of Helmstedt and the now-abolished Landkreis Braunschweig district without the Samtgemeinde of Thedinghausen. In the 1965 through 1972 elections, it comprised the independent city of Wolfsburg and the districts of Helmtedt and Landkreis Braunschweig, again excluding Thedinghausen. In the 1976 election, it comprised Wolfsburg, Helmstedt, and the municipality of Cremlingen and Samtgemeinde of Sickte from the district of Wolfenbüttel. In the 1980 through 1998 elections, it comprised the city of Wolfsburg and district of Helmstedt. It acquired its current borders in the 2002 election.

Election	No.	Name	Borders
1949	29	Braunschweig-Land – Helmstedt	Helmstedt district; Braunschweig district (excluding Thedinghausen Samtgemeinde)
1953	51	Braunschweig-Land – Helmstedt	Helmstedt district; Braunschweig district (excluding Thedinghausen Samtgemeinde)
1957	51	Braunschweig-Land – Helmstedt	Helmstedt district; Braunschweig district (excluding Thedinghausen Samtgemeinde)
1961	51	Braunschweig-Land – Helmstedt	Helmstedt district; Braunschweig district (excluding Thedinghausen Samtgemeinde)
1965	46	Helmstedt – Wolfsburg	Wolfsburg city; Helmstedt district; Braunschweig district (excluding Thedinghausen Samtgemeinde)
1969	46	Helmstedt – Wolfsburg	Wolfsburg city; Helmstedt district; Braunschweig district (excluding Thedinghausen Samtgemeinde)
1972	46	Helmstedt – Wolfsburg	Wolfsburg city; Helmstedt district; Braunschweig district (excluding Thedinghausen Samtgemeinde)
1976	46	Helmstedt – Wolfsburg	Wolfsburg city; Helmstedt district; Wolfenbüttel district (only Cremlingen municipality and Sickte Samtgemeinde)
1980	46	Helmstedt – Wolfsburg	Wolfsburg city; Helmstedt district
1983	46	Helmstedt – Wolfsburg	Wolfsburg city; Helmstedt district
1987	46	Helmstedt – Wolfsburg	Wolfsburg city; Helmstedt district
1990	46	Helmstedt – Wolfsburg	Wolfsburg city; Helmstedt district
1994	46	Helmstedt – Wolfsburg	Wolfsburg city; Helmstedt district
1998	46	Helmstedt – Wolfsburg	Wolfsburg city; Helmstedt district
2002	51	Helmstedt – Wolfsburg	Wolfsburg city; Helmstedt district; Gifhorn district (only Boldecker Land and Brome Samtgemeinden and the Giebel area)
2005	51	Helmstedt – Wolfsburg	Wolfsburg city; Helmstedt district; Gifhorn district (only Boldecker Land and Brome Samtgemeinden and the Giebel area)
2009	52	Helmstedt – Wolfsburg	Wolfsburg city; Helmstedt district; Gifhorn district (only Boldecker Land and Brome Samtgemeinden and the Giebel area)
2013	51	Helmstedt – Wolfsburg	Wolfsburg city; Helmstedt district; Gifhorn district (only Boldecker Land and Brome Samtgemeinden and the Giebel area)
2017	51	Helmstedt – Wolfsburg	Wolfsburg city; Helmstedt district; Gifhorn district (only Boldecker Land and Brome Samtgemeinden and the Giebel area)
2021	51	Helmstedt – Wolfsburg	Wolfsburg city; Helmstedt district; Gifhorn district (only Boldecker Land and Brome Samtgemeinden and the Giebel area)
2025	51	Helmstedt – Wolfsburg	Wolfsburg city; Helmstedt district; Gifhorn district (only Boldecker Land and Brome Samtgemeinden and the Giebel area)

== Members ==
The constituency was first held by Hermann Troppenz of the Social Democratic Party (SPD), who served from 1949 to 1953. Alfred Burgemeister of the Christian Democratic Union (CDU) won in 1953 and served until 1969. Rudolf Hauck of the SPD then served until 1983, when Volkmar Köhler of the CDU won the constituency. Fellow party member Heinrich-Wilhelm Ronsöhr served from 1994 to 1998. In 1998, SPD candidate Bodo Seidenthal regained the constituency, and served a single term. He was succeeded by Hans-Jürgen Uhl, who was elected in 2002 and 2005. Günter Lach of the CDU served from 2009 to 2017. Falko Mohrs has been representative since the 2017 election.

Election	Member	Party	%
1949	Hermann Troppenz	SPD	31.3
1953	Alfred Burgemeister	CDU	36.9
1957	Alfred Burgemeister	CDU	46.2
1961	Alfred Burgemeister	CDU	44.5
1965	Alfred Burgemeister	CDU	49.7
1969	Rudolf Hauck	SPD	47.1
1972	Rudolf Hauck	SPD	53.0
1976	Rudolf Hauck	SPD	47.2
1980	Rudolf Hauck	SPD	48.2
1983	Volkmar Köhler	CDU	52.4
1987	Volkmar Köhler	CDU	47.7
1990	Volkmar Köhler	CDU	50.6
1994	Heinrich-Wilhelm Ronsöhr	CDU	47.7
1998	Bodo Seidenthal	SPD	52.7
2002	Hans-Jürgen Uhl	SPD	53.5
2005	Hans-Jürgen Uhl	SPD	49.5
2009	Günter Lach	CDU	39.4
2013	Günter Lach	CDU	44.7
2017	Falko Mohrs	SPD	38.0
2021	Falko Mohrs	SPD	42.1
2025	Alexander Jordan	CDU	30.9

== Election results ==
=== 2025 election ===
Federal election (2025): Helmstedt – Wolfsburg
Notes:	Blue background denotes the winner of the electorate vote. Pink background denotes a candidate elected from their party list. Yellow background denotes an electorate win by a list member, or other incumbent. A ✓ or ✗ denotes status of any incumbent, win or lose respectively.						
Party	Candidate	Votes	%	±%	Party votes	%	±%
CDU	Alexander Jordan	43,511	30.9	▲4.3	39,109	27.7	▲3.1
SPD	Benjamin Stern	40,099	28.5	▼13.6	32,716	23.2	▼12.0
AfD	Thomas Schlick	31,351	22.3	▲12.7	30,969	22.0	▲12.5
Greens	Marcel Richter	9,630	6.8	▼1.9	11,878	8.4	▼3.6
Left	Julian Böhm	8,687	6.2	▲3.4	9,406	7.6	▲4.0
BSW					6,340	4.5	
FDP	Mats-Ole Maretzke	4,539	3.2	▼4.3	5,335	3.8	▼6.3
Tierschutzpartei					1,908	1.4	0.0
Volt	Stefan Kanitzky	1,831	1.3		911	0.6	▲0.4
FW				▼1.6	739	0.5	▼0.3
Independent	Johann Hönig	781	0.6				
PARTEI					684	0.5	▼0.4
dieBasis					436	0.3	▼0.9
Pirates					286	0.2	▼0.2
MLPD	Peter Kunick	214	0.2		57	0.0	0.0
BD					181	0.1	
Humanists					97	0.1	0.0
Team Todenhöfer							▼0.3
ÖDP				▼0.4			▼0.2
Informal votes		1,246			837		
Total valid votes		140,643			141,052		
Turnout		141,889	80.5	▲8.0			
CDU gain from SPD	Majority	3,412	2.4	▼9.3			

=== 2021 election ===
Federal election (2021): Helmstedt – Wolfsburg
Notes:	Blue background denotes the winner of the electorate vote. Pink background denotes a candidate elected from their party list. Yellow background denotes an electorate win by a list member, or other incumbent. A ✓ or ✗ denotes status of any incumbent, win or lose respectively.						
Party	Candidate	Votes	%	±%	Party votes	%	±%
SPD	✓ Falko Mohrs	54,349	42.1	▲4.1	45,414	35.1	▲5.2
CDU	Andreas Weber	34,367	26.6	▼8.3	31,827	24.6	▼9.9
AfD	Stephanie Scharfenberg	12,339	9.6	▼0.6	12,241	9.5	▼1.5
Greens	Frank Bsirske	11,305	8.8	▲4.3	15,481	12.0	▲6.1
FDP	Kristin Krumm	9,766	7.6	▲1.8	13,073	10.1	▲2.0
Left	Bernd Mex	3,575	2.8	▼3.2	3,496	2.7	▼3.9
Tierschutzpartei					1,749	1.4	▲0.4
dieBasis					1,520	1.2	
PARTEI					1,192	0.9	0.0
FW	Frank Schrödl	2,113	1.6		1,128	0.9	▲0.5
Pirates					529	0.4	0.0
Team Todenhöfer					381	0.3	
Volt					362	0.3	
ÖDP	Dora Weigl	486	0.4		204	0.2	0.0
Independent	Johann Hönig	485	0.4				
Independent	Wilfried Wiesenthal	200	0.2				
NPD					200	0.2	▼0.3
Humanists					118	0.1	
du.					106	0.1	
V-Partei3					85	0.1	▼0.1
Independent	Peter Kunick	63	0.0				
LKR					40	0.0	
DKP					32	0.0	0.0
MLPD					26	0.0	0.0
Informal votes		1,623			1,467		
Total valid votes		129,048			129,204		
Turnout		130,671	72.5	▼2.1			
SPD hold	Majority	19,982	15.5	▲12.4			

=== 2017 election ===
Federal election (2017): Helmstedt – Wolfsburg
Notes:	Blue background denotes the winner of the electorate vote. Pink background denotes a candidate elected from their party list. Yellow background denotes an electorate win by a list member, or other incumbent. A ✓ or ✗ denotes status of any incumbent, win or lose respectively.						
Party	Candidate	Votes	%	±%	Party votes	%	±%
SPD	Falko Mohrs	51,646	38.0	▼0.7	40,740	30.0	▼4.8
CDU	✗ Günter Lach	47,416	34.9	▼9.8	47,037	34.6	▼6.5
AfD	Thomas Schlick	13,857	10.2		14,862	10.9	▲7.2
Left	Pia Zimmermann	8,128	6.0	▲1.6	9,050	6.7	▲1.8
FDP	Kristin Krumm	7,791	5.7	▲4.3	10,988	8.1	▲4.4
Greens	Volker Möll	6,096	4.5	▲0.6	8,064	5.9	▼0.9
Tierschutzpartei					1,307	1.0	▲0.1
PARTEI					1,229	0.9	
Independent	Günter Hönig	746	0.5				
NPD					623	0.5	▼0.9
Pirates					592	0.4	▼1.4
FW					455	0.3	▼0.2
DM					276	0.2	
ÖDP					198	0.1	
V-Partei³					194	0.1	
MLPD	Gerhard Pfisterer	152	0.1		82	0.1	0.0
DiB					141	0.1	
BGE					138	0.1	
DKP					36	0.0	
Informal votes		1,471			1,291		
Total valid votes		135,832			136,012		
Turnout		137,303	74.6	▲3.5			
SPD gain from CDU	Majority	4,230	3.1				

=== 2013 election ===
Federal election (2013): Helmstedt – Wolfsburg
Notes:	Blue background denotes the winner of the electorate vote. Pink background denotes a candidate elected from their party list. Yellow background denotes an electorate win by a list member, or other incumbent. A ✓ or ✗ denotes status of any incumbent, win or lose respectively.						
Party	Candidate	Votes	%	±%	Party votes	%	±%
CDU	✓ Günter Lach	58,760	44.7	▲5.3	54,188	41.1	▲7.2
SPD	Heinz-Joachim Barchmann	50,826	38.7	▲4.1	45,837	34.8	▲3.0
Greens	Volker Möll	6,666	5.1	▼3.0	9,004	6.8	▼2.0
Left	Pia Zimmermann	5,731	4.4	▼3.3	6,440	4.9	▼3.6
AfD					4,892	3.7	
Pirates	Jürgen Stemke	2,972	2.3		2,460	1.9	▼0.3
NPD	Friedrich Preuß	2,599	2.0	▼0.3	1,840	1.4	▼0.6
FDP	Verony Reichelt	1,839	1.4	▼5.0	4,796	3.6	▼6.9
Tierschutzpartei					1,182	0.9	0.0
FW	Gabriele Chartier	1,049	0.8		643	0.5	
Independent	Günter Hönig	569	0.4				
PBC	Detleff Karstens	331	0.3	▼0.1	254	0.2	
PRO					157	0.1	
REP					44	0.0	
MLPD					38	0.0	0.0
Informal votes		1,927			1,494		
Total valid votes		131,342			131,775		
Turnout		133,269	71.1	▼0.9			
CDU hold	Majority	7,934	6.0	▲1.2			

=== 2009 election ===
Federal election (2009): Helmstedt – Wolfsburg
Notes:	Blue background denotes the winner of the electorate vote. Pink background denotes a candidate elected from their party list. Yellow background denotes an electorate win by a list member, or other incumbent. A ✓ or ✗ denotes status of any incumbent, win or lose respectively.						
Party	Candidate	Votes	%	±%	Party votes	%	±%
CDU	Günter Lach	52,427	39.4	▲2.1	45,319	34.0	▲2.1
SPD	Heinz-Joachim Barchmann	46,064	34.6	▼14.9	42,391	31.8	▼15.0
Greens	Torsten Koch	10,692	8.0	▲4.3	11,801	8.8	▲3.1
Left	Dorothée Menzner	10,216	7.7	▲3.8	11,309	8.5	▲4.0
FDP	Michael Heitchen	8,480	6.4	▲3.1	14,114	10.6	▲2.8
NPD	Friedrich Preuß	3,023	2.3	▲0.4	2,606	2.0	▲0.2
Pirates					2,905	2.2	
RRP	Klaus Glahn	1,748	1.3		1,591	1.2	
Tierschutzpartei					1,176	0.9	▲0.2
PBC	Detleff Karstens	415	0.3				
ÖDP					112	0.1	
DVU					101	0.1	
MLPD					46	0.0	0.0
Informal votes		2,196			1,790		
Total valid votes		133,065			133,471		
Turnout		135,261	72.0	▼6.5			
CDU gain from SPD	Majority	6,363	4.8				

=== 2005 election ===
Federal election (2005):Helmstedt – Wolfsburg
Notes:	Blue background denotes the winner of the electorate vote. Pink background denotes a candidate elected from their party list. Yellow background denotes an electorate win by a list member, or other incumbent. A ✓ or ✗ denotes status of any incumbent, win or lose respectively.						
Party	Candidate	Votes	%	±%	Party votes	%	±%
SPD	✓ Hans-Jürgen Uhl	71,846	49.5	▼4.0	67,936	46.7	▼5.8
CDU	Angelika Jahns	54,172	37.3	▲0.5	46,352	31.9	▼2.0
Left	Jürgen Lerchner	5,607	3.8	▲2.9	6,567	4.5	▲3.7
Greens	Petra Schmieta-Lüdtke	5,414	3.7	▲0.2	8,297	5.7	▲0.7
FDP	Marco Meiners	4,718	3.2	▼0.3	11,368	4.5	▲3.7
NPD	Friedrich Preuß	2,782	1.9	▲0.8	2,601	1.8	▲1.1
Tierschutzpartei					988	0.7	▲0.3
PBC	Detleff Karstens	675	0.5	▲0.2	442	0.3	▲0.1
GRAUEN					660	0.5	▲0.3
Pro German Center – Pro D-Mark Initiative					13	0.01	
MLPD					62	0.0	
BüSo					56	0.0	0.0
Informal votes		2,809			2,591		
Total valid votes		145,214			145,432		
Turnout		148,023	78.5	▼1.8			
SPD hold	Majority	17,674	12.2				
