= List of Stolpersteine in Achim =

Memorial installations in Germany

This article lists the Stolpersteine laid as part of the project of the same name by Gunter Demnig in Achim. They serve as a memorial to victims of National Socialism who lived and worked in Achim.

== Stolpersteine laid ==
Image	Person, inscription	Address	Date laid	Note
Margarethe Anspacher	Here lived Margarethe Anspacher b. 1906 deported 1941 murdered in Minsk	Am Schmiedeberg 10 53.0118098°N 9.0345766°E	4 October 2006	
Paul Anspacher	Here lived Paul Anspacher b. 1895 deported 1941 murdered in Minsk	Am Schmiedeberg 10 53.0118098°N 9.0345766°E	4 October 2006	
Ilse Friedemann	Here lived Ilse Friedemann b. 1904 deported 1941 murdered in Minsk	Am Schmiedeberg 10 53.0118098°N 9.0345766°E	4 October 2006	
Louis Friedemann	Here lived Louis Friedemann b. 1871 deported 1941 murdered in Minsk	Am Schmiedeberg 10 53.0118098°N 9.0345766°E	4 October 2006	
Ernst Friedemann	Here lived Ernst Friedemann b. 1899 deported 1941 murdered in Minsk	Am Schmiedeberg 10 53.0118098°N 9.0345766°E	4 October 2006	
Lina Friedemann	Here lived Lina Friedemann b. 1868 deported 1941 murdered in Minsk	Am Schmiedeberg 10 53.0118098°N 9.0345766°E	4 October 2006	
centered	Here lived Albert Anspacher b. 1887 deported 1941 murdered in Minsk	Am Schmiedeberg 12 53.0115032°N 9.0349688°E	4 October 2006	
Emma Anspacher	Here lived Emma Anspacher b. 1896 deported 1941 murdered in Minsk	Am Schmiedeberg 12 53.0115032°N 9.0349688°E	4 October 2006	
	Here lived Kurt Anspacher Curt Parker b. 1925 deported 1941 Minsk ghetto forced labor 1945 Dachau concentration camp liberated	Am Schmiedeberg 12 53.0115032°N 9.0349688°E	9 November 2023	
Marie Sophie Wülbers	Here lived Marie Sophie Wülbers b. 1892 committed 1935 Rotenburg/Wümme mental institution 'transferred' 1941 Weilmünster mental institution murdered 22 April 1942	Badener Dorfstraße 31 53.0030088°N 9.0845334°E	5 November 2011	
Else Lisbeth Warnken	Here lived Else Lisbeth Warnken b. 1923 committed 1933 Rotenburg/Wümme mental institution forced sterilization died 26 June 1937	Bahnhofstraße 49 53.0048418°N 9.0828343°E	5 November 2011	
Carl Anspacher	Here lived Carl Ansbacher b. 1891 deported 1941 murdered in Minsk	Eckstraße 16 53.0105381°N 9.0349163°E	4 October 2006	
Liesel Anspacher	Here lived Liesel Ansbacher b. 1924 deported 1941 murdered in Minsk	Eckstraße 16 53.0105381°N 9.0349163°E	4 October 2006	
Lilli Anspacher	Here lived Lilli Ansbacher b. 1897 deported 1941 murdered in Minsk	Eckstraße 16 53.0105381°N 9.0349163°E	4 October 2006	
Lotte Alexander	Here lived Lotte Alexander b. 1924 deported 1941 murdered in Minsk	Obernstraße 6 53.0127863°N 9.0314363°E	4 October 2006	
Margarete Alexander	Here lived Margarete Alexander b. 1888 deported 1941 murdered in Minsk	Obernstraße 6 53.0127863°N 9.0314363°E	4 October 2006	
Paul Alexander	Here lived Paul Alexander b. 1884 deported 1941 murdered in Minsk	Obernstraße 6 53.0127863°N 9.0314363°E	4 October 2006	
Peter Alexander	Here lived Peter Alexander b. 1914 deported 1941 murdered in Minsk	Obernstraße 6 53.0127863°N 9.0314363°E	4 October 2006	
Albert Seligmann	Here lived Albert Seligmann b. 1869 deported 1942 murdered in Theresienstadt	Obernstraße 22 53.0127984°N 9.0341365°E	23 October 2005	Master butcher Albert Seligmann was born on 9 May 1869 as the son of Philipp and Henriette Seligmann in the municipality of Ronnenberg (Linden district) near Hanover. He grew up in Ronnenberg and neighboring Empelde. On 12 September 1894 he married Jenny Alexander in Achim. There the family, which included two children, ran a butcher's shop. The elder son, Hugo Seligmann, was killed in the First World War. From 1913 to 1933 Albert Seligmann served as guild master of the butchers' guild. The boycott of Jewish businesses on 1 April 1933 put the family under financial pressure: customers stayed away and livestock was no longer delivered. In 1937 the butcher shop was closed by police order. The son, Wilhelm Seligmann, emigrated to the US with his family in 1938. Albert Seligmann and his wife were eventually forced into the so-called "Jews' house" at Nordstraße 210 in Bremen. In mid-July 1942 he was sent to the Theresienstadt "ghetto," which was in reality a concentration camp, and from there deported on 26 September 1942 to the Treblinka extermination camp. He was murdered there. At the time the Stolperstein was laid, his deportation to Treblinka was not yet known.
Jenny Seligmann	Here lived Jenny Seligmann b. 1868 deported 1942 murdered in Theresienstadt	Obernstraße 22 53.0127984°N 9.0341365°E	23 October 2005	Jenny Seligmann was born on 10 September 1868 in Achim. After her marriage to Albert Seligmann she lived with him in Achim. The couple had two children. The boycott of Jewish businesses on 1 April 1933 put her under financial pressure. Jenny Seligmann and her husband were eventually forced into the so-called "Jews' house" at Nordstraße 210 in Bremen. In mid-July 1942 she was sent to the Theresienstadt "ghetto" and from there deported on 26 September 1942 to the Treblinka extermination camp. She was murdered there. At the time the Stolperstein was laid, her deportation to Treblinka was not yet known.
centered	Here lived Mathilde Heilbronn née Hertz b. 1882 fled 1939 England died 1940	Obernstraße 36 53.01224°N 9.03554°E	1 October 2021	
centered	Here lived Siegfried Heilbronn b. 1881 fled 1939 England interned Australia released 1942	Obernstraße 36 53.01224°N 9.03554°E	1 October 2021	
centered	Here lived Kurt Heilbronn b. 1914 fled 1934 England	Obernstraße 36 53.01224°N 9.03554°E	1 October 2021	
centered	Here lived Paula Heilbronn married name Williams b. 1911 fled 1937 USA	Obernstraße 36 53.01224°N 9.03554°E	1 October 2021	
centered	Here lived Rosi Podell née Heilbronn b. 1918 fled 1938 USA	Obernstraße 36 53.01224°N 9.03554°E	1 October 2021	
centered	Here lived Willy Podell Wolf Podolski b. 1912 fled 1938 USA	Obernstraße 36 53.01224°N 9.03554°E	1 October 2021	
centered	Here lived Hans Heilbronn John Hans Hilton b. 1913 fled 1937 USA	Obernstraße 36 53.01224°N 9.03554°E	1 October 2021	
Emma Baumgarten	Here lived Emma Baumgarten b. 1881 deported 1942 Theresienstadt murdered in Auschwitz	Obernstraße 93 53.0080641°N 9.0423636°E	4 October 2006	
Friedrich Eduard Brüns	Here lived Friedrich Eduard Brüns b. 1905 committed 1925 Rotenburg/Wümme mental institution 'transferred' 1941 Weilmünster mental institution murdered 25 October 1941	Philosophenweg 1 53.0147683°N 9.0285399°E	5 November 2011	
Hinrich Rebers	Here lived Hinrich Rebers b. 1909 committed 1935 Rotenburg/Wümme mental institution 'transferred' 1941 Sorau/Lausitz mental institution murdered 30 November 1943	Uphuser Heerstraße 71 53.0302393°N 8.9657031°E	5 November 2011	
