= Alexander Bartz =

German politician (SPD)

Member of the Bundestag; for Helmstedt – Wolfsburg
- In office 8 November 2022 – 25 March 2025
- Preceded by: Falko Mohrs
- Succeeded by: Alexander Jordan

Personal details
- Born: 13 August 1984 (age 42) Vechta, West Germany
- Party: Social Democratic
- Children: 2

Alexander Bartz (born 13 August 1984) is a German politician of the Social Democratic Party (SPD) who served as a Member of the Bundestag from 2022 to 2025.

== Political career ==
Bartz was previously involved with Young Socialists in the SPD.

In the 2021 German federal election, Bartz stood in the Cloppenburg-Vechta constituency and was 25th place on the SPD state list in Lower Saxony. On 8 November 2022, he replaced Falko Mohrs, who took over a ministerial post in the Lower Saxony state government, in the Bundestag. In parliament, he served on the Committee on Economic Affairs.
