= Bodo Seidenthal =

German politician (1947–2024)

Member of the Bundestag; from Lower Saxony
- In office 18 February 1987 – 17 October 2002
- Preceded by: Multi-member district
- Succeeded by: Hans-Jürgen Uhl
- Constituency: State list (1987–1998); Helmstedt – Wolfsburg (1998–2002)

Personal details
- Born: 26 June 1947 Königslutter, Germany
- Died: 10 May 2024 (aged 76)
- Party: Social Democratic
- Children: 1
- Occupation: Engineer

Bodo Seidenthal (26 June 1947 – 10 May 2024) was a German engineer and politician. A member of the Social Democratic Party, he served in the Bundestag from 1987 to 2002.

Seidenthal died on 10 May 2024, at the age of 76.
