= Günter Lach =

German politician (1954–2021)

- Lach in 2008

Member of the Bundestag; for Helmstedt – Wolfsburg
- In office 27 October 2009 – 23 October 2017
- Preceded by: Dieter Steinecke
- Succeeded by: Falko Mohrs

Mayor of Wolfsburg
- In office 2006–2011

Personal details
- Born: 13 July 1954 Vorsfelde, West Germany
- Died: 15 December 2021 (aged 67) Wolfsburg, Germany
- Party: Christian Democratic Union

Günter Lach (13 July 1954 – 15 December 2021) was a German politician who served as a member of the Bundestag, and was mayor of Vorsfelde and Wolfsburg.

== Biography ==
Lach was born on 13 July 1954 in Vorsfelde, Wolfsburg. In 1970, he started working for Volkswagen as a technical engineer. In 1996, he became a member of the city council of Wolfsburg for the CDU. In 2001, he became mayor of Vorsfelde. Between 2006 and 2011, Lach served as mayor of Wolfsburg. He was a member of the Bundestag from 27 October 2009 until 23 October 2017.

Lach died on 15 December 2021 at the age of 67.
