= Alfred Burgemeister =

German politician (1906–1970)

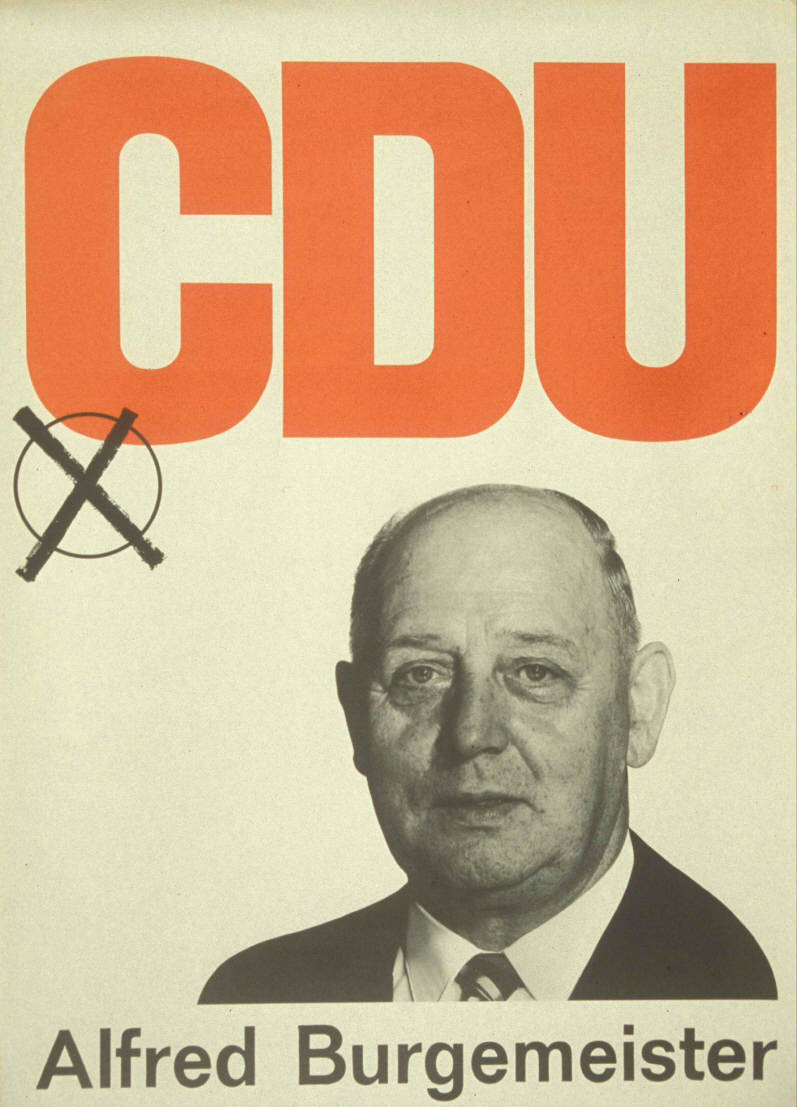
- Candidate poster of Alfred Burgemeister for the 1969 Bundestag elections

Member of the Bundestag; from Lower Saxony
- In office 6 October 1953 – 23 April 1970
- Preceded by: Hermann Troppenz
- Succeeded by: Alfred Hein
- Constituency: Braunschweig-Land – Helmstedt (1953–1965); Helmstedt – Wolfsburg (1965–1969); State list (1969–1970)

Personal details
- Born: Alfred Erich Wilhelm Burgemeister; 22 July 1906 Perleberg, Germany
- Died: 23 April 1970 (aged 63) Munich, West Germany
- Party: Christian Democratic Union
- Children: 3
- Occupation: Salesman

Alfred Burgemeister (22 July 1906 – 23 April 1970) was a German politician of the Christian Democratic Union (CDU) and former member of the German Bundestag.

== Military career ==
After undertaking a commercial apprenticeship in 1926, he joined the German Army. He attended the Army College for Administration and Economics from 1928 to 1934. Burgemeister was a colonel in the 524th Grenadier Regiment and in May 2, 1945, he was awarded the Knight's Cross of the Iron Cross. However this award has been rejected by historians later as an unofficial award.

== Political career ==
Burgemeister joined the CDU. From 1962 to 1970 he was chairman of the district association Helmstedt and from 1968 to 1970 of the regional association Braunschweig. He was also a member of the executive board of the Lower Saxony CDU.

As a direct candidate, he was a member of the Bundestag from 1953 to 1965 for Braunschweig-Land – Helmstedt, and from 1965 to 1969 for Helmstedt – Wolfsburg, as well as in 1969 via 3rd place on the Lower Saxony state list.

From 1957 to 1963, he was chairman of the middle class discussion group of the CDU/CSU parliamentary group. In 1960/61 he was deputy chairman of the parliamentary group under Heinrich Krone. From 1963 to 1969 he was chairman of the parliamentary group's working group on economics and nutrition.

He was a full member of the Committee on Civil Service Law (1953–1957), the Committee on Food, Agriculture and Forestry (1956–1957), the Committee on Pan-German and Berlin Issues (1953–1957), the Defence Committee (1969–1970), the Committee on Health Care (1957–1960) and the Committee on Small and Medium-Sized Businesses (1957–1965). He was also a deputy member of the Committee on Internal Administration and Home Affairs (1955–1965), the Committee on Posts and Telecommunications (1955–1957), the Committee on Special Questions concerning Small and Medium-Sized Enterprises (1956–1957), the Committee on Health Care (1960–1961), the Committee on Defence (1953–1961, 1970), the Committee on War Victims and Refugees (1961–1965) and the Committee on Economic Affairs and Small and Medium-Sized Enterprises (1965–1970).

== Literature ==
Herbst, Ludolf; Jahn, Bruno (2002). Vierhaus, Rudolf (ed.). Biographisches Handbuch der Mitglieder des Deutschen Bundestages. 1949–2002 [Biographical Handbook of the Members of the German Bundestag. 1949–2002] (in German). München: De Gruyter - De Gruyter Saur. p. 1715. ISBN 978-3-11-184511-1.
