= Emtinghausen =

- Municipality
- Flag Coat of arms

- Location of Emtinghausen within Verden district
- Interactive map of Emtinghausen
- Location within Germany Location within Lower Saxony
- Coordinates: 52°56′N 8°58′E
- Country: Germany
- State: Lower Saxony
- District: Verden
- Municipal assoc.: Thedinghausen
- Subdivisions: 2 Ortschaften

Government
  - Mayor: Gerold Bremer (CDU)

Area
  - Total: 21.33 km^{2} (8.24 sq mi)
- Elevation: 8 m (26 ft)

Population (2025-12-31)
  - Total: 1,532
  - Density: 71.82/km^{2} (186.0/sq mi)
- Time zone: UTC+01:00 (CET)
  - Summer (DST): UTC+02:00 (CEST)
- Postal codes: 27321
- Dialling codes: 0 42 95
- Vehicle registration: VER
- Website: www.thedinghausen.de

Emtinghausen (German pronunciation: [ɛmtɪŋˈhaʊzn̩]; Low German: Emhusen) is a municipality in the district of Verden, in Lower Saxony, Germany.
