= Riede =

- Municipality
- Coat of arms

- Location of Riede within Verden district
- Interactive map of Riede
- Location within Germany Location within Lower Saxony
- Coordinates: 52°58′N 08°57′E
- Country: Germany
- State: Lower Saxony
- District: Verden
- Municipal assoc.: Thedinghausen
- Subdivisions: 3 Ortsteile

Government
  - Mayor: Jürgen Winkelmann (SPD)

Area
  - Total: 27.05 km^{2} (10.44 sq mi)
- Elevation: 8 m (26 ft)

Population (2025-12-31)
  - Total: 3,090
  - Density: 114/km^{2} (296/sq mi)
- Time zone: UTC+01:00 (CET)
  - Summer (DST): UTC+02:00 (CEST)
- Postal codes: 27339
- Dialling codes: 04294
- Vehicle registration: VER
- Website: www.thedinghausen.de

Riede (German pronunciation: [ˈʁiːdə]) is a municipality in the district of Verden, in Lower Saxony, Germany.
