= Alexander Jordan =

German politician (born 1981)

Alexander Jordan MdB

Member of the Bundestag; for Helmstedt – Wolfsburg
- Incumbent
- Assumed office 25 March 2025
- Preceded by: Alexander Bartz

Personal details
- Born: 21 November 1981 (age 44) Berlin, Germany
- Party: Christian Democratic Union

Alexander Jordan (born 21 November 1981) is a German politician from the Christian Democratic Union (CDU).

In the 2025 German federal election, he was the direct candidate in Helmstedt – Wolfsburg and was elected with 30.9% of the first vote.

== See also ==
- List of members of the 21st Bundestag
