= Martin Schmidt (handballer) =

German handball player (born 1969)

Personal information
- Nationality: German
- Born: 22 December 1969 (age 56) Achim, West Germany
- Height: 187 cm (74 in)

Sport
- Sport: Handball
- Position: Right wing

Youth career
- Years: Team
- 1977-1983: TSV Achim
- 1983-1987: TV Baden

Senior clubs
- Years: Team
- 1987-1989: TV Baden
- 1989-1991: SG Bremen-Ost
- 1991-2003: THW Kiel
- 2003-?: SV Mönkeberg
National team
Years	Team	Apps	(Gls)
1994-?	Germany	42	(67)

Martin Schmidt (born 22 December 1969) is a German handball player. He was a member of the Germany men's national handball team. He was part of the team at the 1996 Summer Olympics, where Germany finished 7th. He played three matches.

On club level he played most of his career for THW Kiel, where he spent 12 seasons. In this period he won the German Championship seven times, the DHB-Pokal three times, the DHB-Supercup twice and the EHF Cup twice. He also reached the final of the EHF Champions League in 2000, but lost to FC Barcelona.

His son Jesper Schmidt is also a handball player.
