= Blender, Germany =

Blender
- Municipality
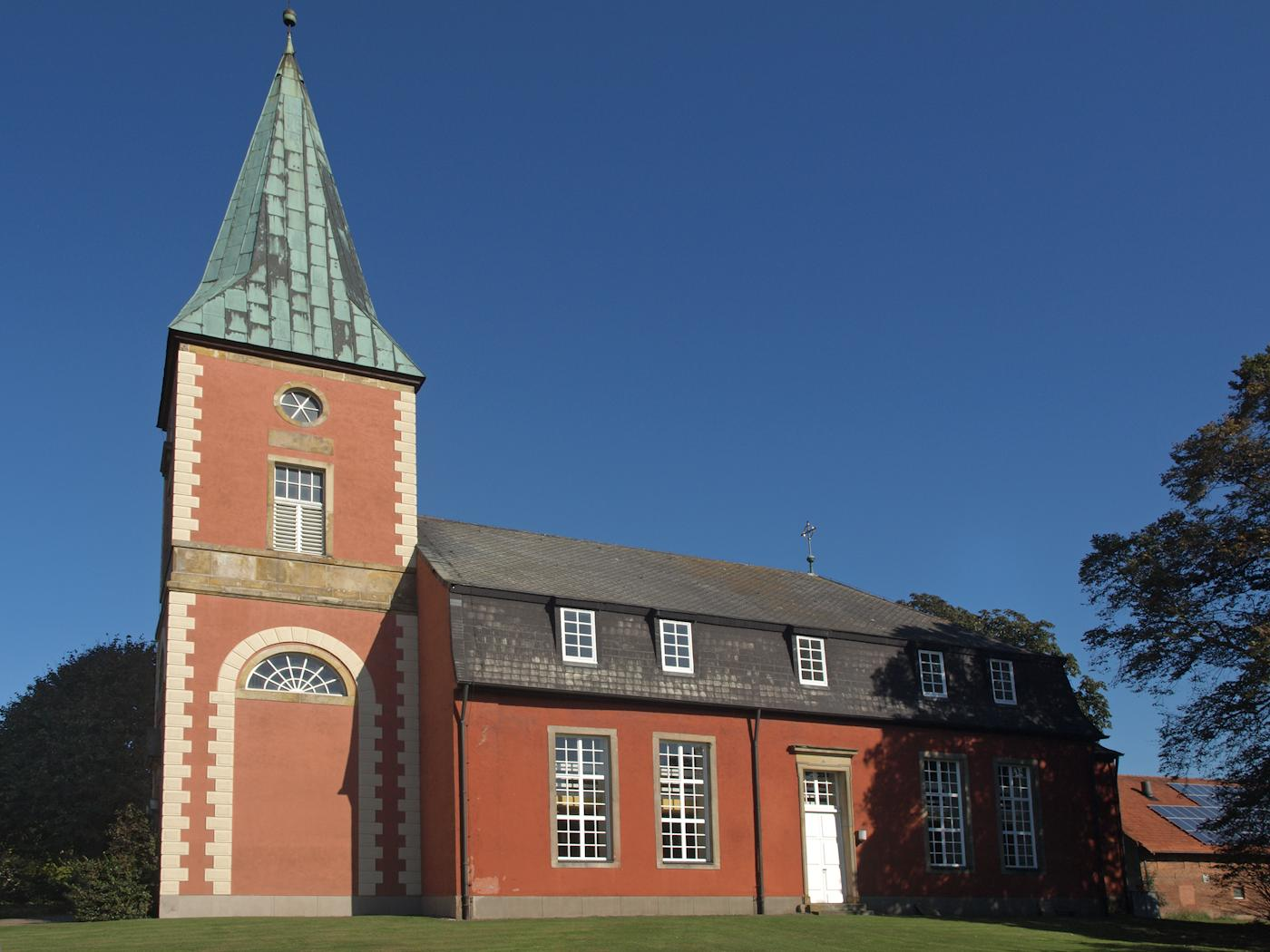
- Church of Saint Michael in Intschede

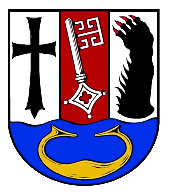
- Coat of arms

- Location of Blender within Verden district
- Interactive map of Blender
- Location within Germany Location within Lower Saxony
- Coordinates: 52°55′N 09°08′E
- Country: Germany
- State: Lower Saxony
- District: Verden
- Municipal assoc.: Thedinghausen

Government
  - Mayor: Patrick Rott (CDU)

Area
  - Total: 38.44 km^{2} (14.84 sq mi)
- Elevation: 12 m (39 ft)

Population (2025-12-31)
  - Total: 2,817
  - Density: 73.28/km^{2} (189.8/sq mi)
- Time zone: UTC+01:00 (CET)
  - Summer (DST): UTC+02:00 (CEST)
- Postal codes: 27337
- Dialling codes: 04233
- Vehicle registration: VER
- Website: www.thedinghausen.de

Blender (German pronunciation: [ˈblɛndɐ]) is a municipality in the district of Verden, in Lower Saxony, Germany.
