= Posthausen (Ottersberg) =

- Ortsteil of Ottersberg
- Interactive map of Posthausen
- Location within Germany Location within Lower Saxony
- Coordinates: 53°03′33″N 09°10′20″E
- Country: Germany
- State: Lower Saxony
- District: Verden
- Municipality: Ottersberg

Area
  - Total: 4.53 km^{2} (1.75 sq mi)
- Elevation: 16 m (52 ft)
- Time zone: UTC+01:00 (CET)
  - Summer (DST): UTC+02:00 (CEST)
- Postal codes: 28870
- Dialling codes: 04297

Posthausen is a district of the municipality Ottersberg in the northern district of Verden in Lower Saxony.

== Location and transport links ==
The place is six kilometers south of the core town of Ottersberg on the state road L 155. The A1 runs 2.5 km to the north and the A 27 six kilometers to the south.

== History ==
The origins of the place can be found in the colonization of the Hellweger Moor, which began at the end of the 17th century. Posthausen consists of several street villages such as Allerdorf, Grasdorf, Hintzendorf, Schanzendorf, Stellenfelde, Mitteldorf, Giersdorf. The church in Posthausen was consecrated in 1852.

As a political municipality, Posthausen was formed on July 1, 1968 through the merger of the four municipalities Giersdorf-Schanzendorf, Grasdorf, Hintzendorf and Wümmingen. Four years later, on July 1, 1972, the community of Posthausen was incorporated into the unified community of Flecken Ottersberg.

On September 1, 1960, the communities of Allerdorf and Hintzendorf-Stellenfelde were merged to form the community of Hintzendorf.

== Economy ==
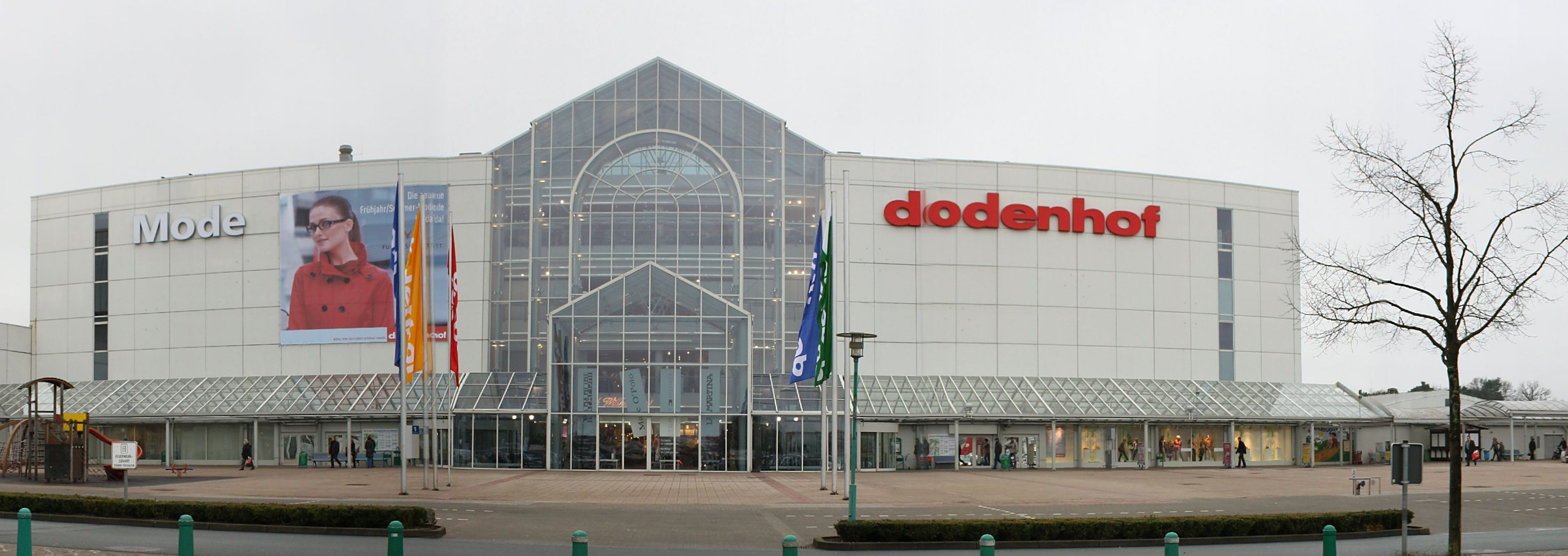
Dodenhof: Main entrance fashion house

Since it was founded as a small family business in 1910, the Dodenhof department store has developed into the largest shopping center in Northern Germany and thus also an important economic factor in the region.

== Politic ==
The local council of Posthausen has eight members including the local mayor Reiner Sterna, CDU.
