= Jewish Cemetery, Achim =

Coordinates: 53°00′48″N 9°02′53″E

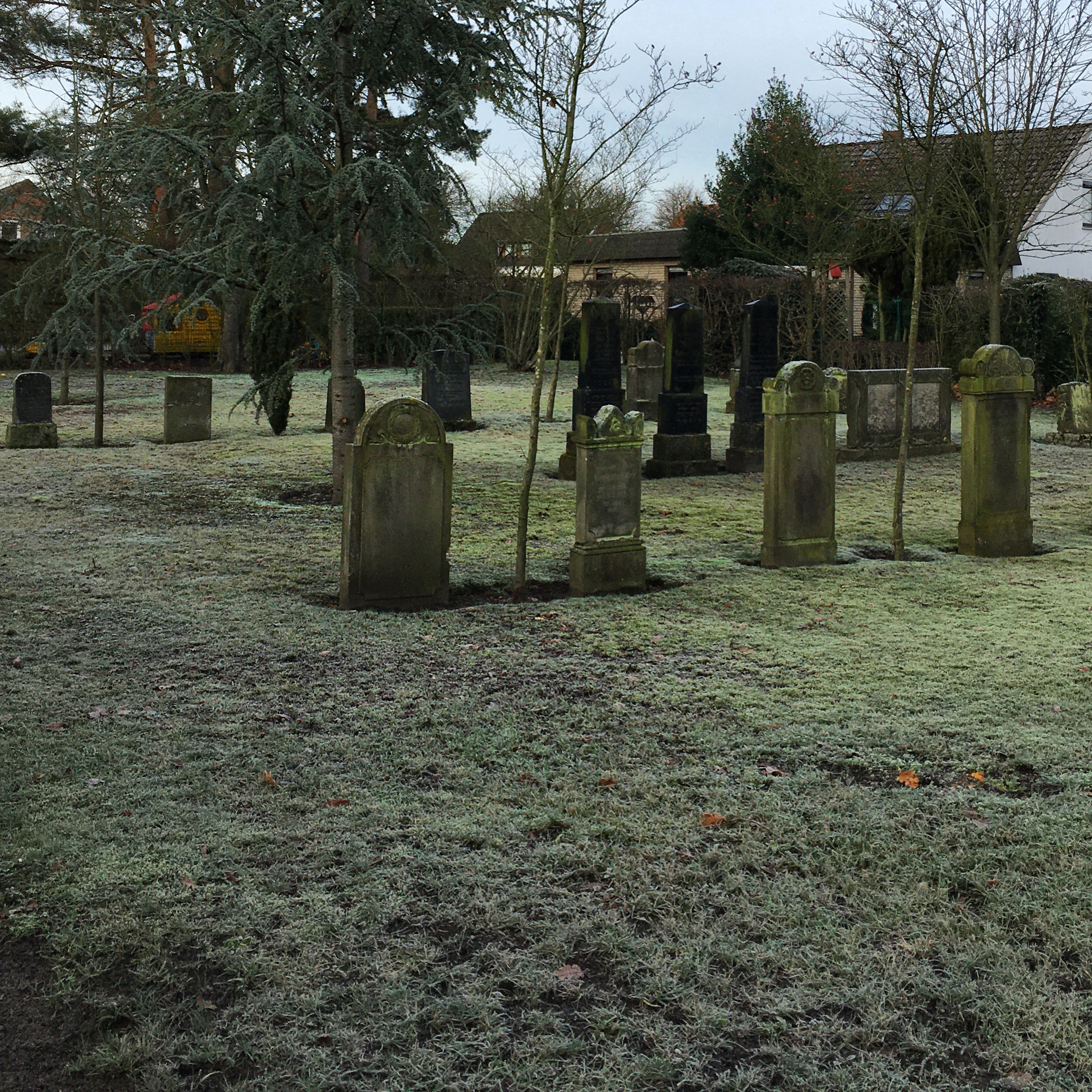
Jewish Cemetery in Achim

The Achim Jewish Cemetery is located in Achim on the street "An der Eisenbahn" and is a protected cultural heritage monument.

== Description ==
The Achim Synagogue community established a burial ground for all Jews in the Achim area in 1865, since the nearest existing cemeteries, in Hoyerhagen and Hastedt, were about 30 kilometers away. The cemetery, covering around 1,000 square meters, contains 56 gravestones for Jews from Achim and the surrounding area who died between 1867 and 1935. During this period at least 61 burials of members of the Achim synagogue community took place there.

During Kristallnacht in 1938, the Jewish cemetery in Achim was also badly vandalized; in 1942 the municipality of Achim wanted to convert the cemetery back into farmland. However, this did not happen, because the Reichssicherheitshauptamt first wanted to have the value of the gravestones assessed, which had still not been done by the end of the war in 1945. The Jewish cemetery subsequently fell increasingly into disrepair until 2002.

An exhibition at Achim town hall in September 2010 provided comprehensive information about the Jewish cemetery for the first time.
