= Heinz-Joachim Barchmann =

German politician and trade unionist

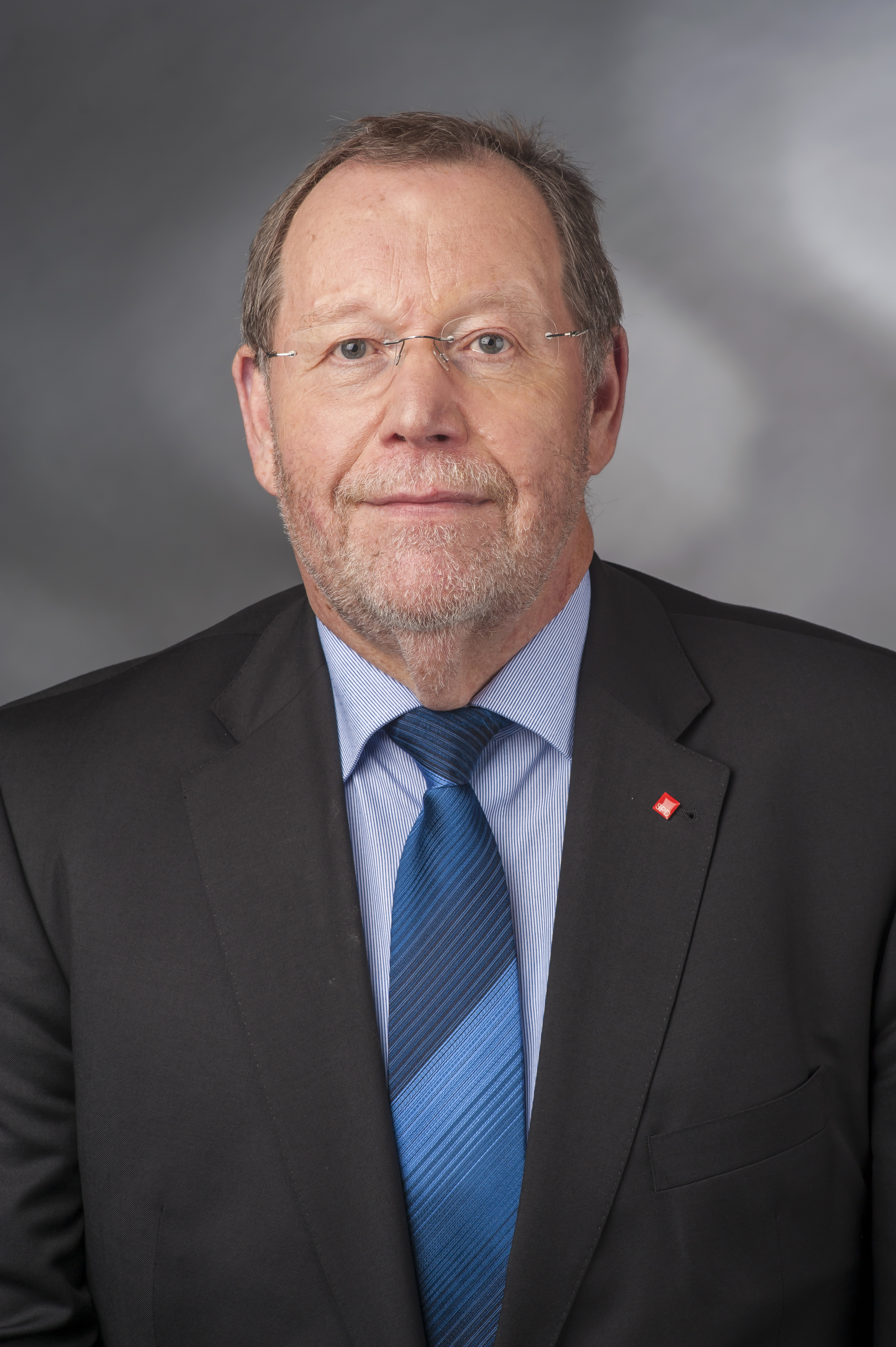
- Heinz-Joachim Barchmann (2014)
- Incumbent
- Assumed office 2009

Personal details
- Born: 17 November 1950 (age 75) Wunstorf-Idensen, Germany
- Party: SDP
- Website: https://www.achim-barchmann.de

Heinz-Joachim Barchmann (born 17 November 1950), also known as Achim Barchmann, is a German SPD politician and trade unionist. Heinz-Joachin Barchmann has been a member of the German Bundestag since 2009.

== Professional career ==
After graduating from Handelsschule (business school), Brachmann pursued commercial education. From 1982 to 1985 he attended evening classes after high school and subsequently studied at the Sozialakademie Dortmund. He has actively several as secretary in the Confederation of German Trade Unions (DGB) since 1987. From 1992 he was chairman of the DGB-Kreis Wolfsburg-Gifhorn-Helmstedt. From 2007 to 2009, he was chairman of the DGB-Region South-East Lower Saxony.

He has been a member of the Verwaltungsrat (board) of Allgemeine Ortskrankenkasse (AOK) Lower Saxony. From 2001 to 2009, he was one of the alternating directors of the Medizinischen Dienst der Krankenkassen (MDK) in Lower Saxony.

== Political career ==
Barchmann has been a member of the SDP since 1979. He has also been a member of the SPD-Bezirksvorstand Braunschweig since 2007.

In the 2009 German federal election, he ran in the Election District Helmstedt – Wolfsburg with a direct mandate. With 34.6% of the first preference votes he obtained second place, but was able to obtain the eleventh place on the Lower Saxon Landesliste and entry into the Bundestag. In the Bundestag, he is a member of the "Committee on the Affairs of the European Union" as well as a deputy in the Committee on Labor and Social Affairs. In the Bundestagswahl 2013 he ran again in the Helmstedt-Wolfsburg electoral district retained his membership in the Bundestag.

== Memberships ==
Barchmann is a member of the German Bundestag European Union Parliamentary Group (Europa-Union Parliamentariergruppe Deutscher Bundestag) and the Parliamentary Association for the Mediterranean (PV-UfM). He has been a trade unionist since 1971, first at the Gewerkschaft Handel, Banken und Versicherungen (HBV) (now part of ver.di). He is a member of the club "Mach meinen Kumpel nicht an!" ("Don't drive my buddy crazy!"), a supporting member of the UNO-Flüchtlingshilfe, voluntary chairman of Arbeiterwohlfahrt (AWO) district association in Helmstedt, deputy chairman of the AWO district association Braunschweig, and also non-executive director of the AWO seniors and Pflege Elm-Lappwald gGmbH.
