= Ottersberg =

- Municipality
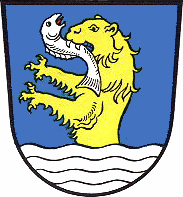
- Coat of arms

- Location of Ottersberg within Verden district
- Interactive map of Ottersberg
- Location within Germany Location within Lower Saxony
- Coordinates: 53°06′N 09°09′E
- Country: Germany
- State: Lower Saxony
- District: Verden

Government
  - Mayor (2020–25): Tim Willy Weber

Area
  - Total: 99.11 km^{2} (38.27 sq mi)
- Elevation: 14 m (46 ft)

Population (2025-12-31)
  - Total: 13,255
  - Density: 133.7/km^{2} (346.4/sq mi)
- Time zone: UTC+01:00 (CET)
  - Summer (DST): UTC+02:00 (CEST)
- Postal codes: 28870
- Dialling codes: 04205
- Vehicle registration: VER
- Website: www.flecken-ottersberg.de

Ottersberg (German pronunciation: [ˈɔtɐsbɛʁk]; Low German: Otterbarg) is a municipality in the district of Verden, in Lower Saxony, Germany. It is situated approximately 20 km north of Verden, and 28 km east of Bremen.

== History ==
Ottersberg belonged - as to its government - to the Prince-Archbishopric of Bremen, established in 1180. In religious respect, however, Ottersberg formed part of the Roman Catholic Diocese of Verden until after 1566 its incumbent bishops lost papal recognition, except for a last Catholic bishop from 1630 to 1631, respectively. In 1648 the Prince-Archbishopric was transformed into the Duchy of Bremen - Verden. which was first ruled in personal union by the Swedish Crown - interrupted by a Danish occupation (1712–1715) - and from 1715 on by the Hanoverian Crown. The Kingdom of Hanover incorporated the Duchy in a real union and the Ducal territory became part of the new Stade Region, established in 1823.

== Geography ==
Ottersberg lies on a sandy ridge, part of a glacial moraine in the valley of the Wümme. In winter the lowland areas are often under water for weeks at a time and form a valuable bird sanctuary of international importance. It lies on the A 1 road between Bremen and Hamburg. The Bremen - Hamburg railway line originally passed south of the village. After the Second World War the district around the station developed to the south of the railway line. The station is called Ottersberg (Hanover), because it lies in the historical country of Hanover.

== Local government ==
Since the local administrative and territorial reforms of 1972, there is a unified community called Flecken Ottersberg consisting of the hamlets of Ottersberg itself plus Fischerhude, Quelkhorn, Otterstedt, Posthausen (Ottersberg), Eckstever and Narthauen.

Since the September 2011 municipal elections the council consists of five groups: Christian Democratic Union of Germany (11 seats), Social Democratic Party of Germany (8 seats), Alliance '90/The Greens (5 seats), Free Green Citizens Ottersberg (FGBO) (3 seats) and The Left (Germany) (1 seat). The full-time mayor is directly elected.

== Town crest ==
The crest is a rising up from the water of an otter with fish in its mouth) on a blue background. The otter is not presented naturalistically, but as a modified otter with a heraldic lion's head and claws.

== Education ==
Ottersberg is the seat of the University of Applied Sciences and Arts in Ottersberg (Hochschule für Künste im Sozialen Ottersberg) which offers bachelor's and master's degrees in social art, Art Therapy, theater, social studies and Fine Art. Since 1946 the Free Rudolf Steiner School of Ottersberg has occupied the site of the former castle. The embankments and ditch of the castle remain in evidence.

== Culture ==
The artist Otto Modersohn (1865–1943) lived in Ottersberg and is buried in the churchyard at Quelkhorn.
