= Catharine Wolpmann =

Catharine Wolpmann (c. 1603 – fl. 1659) was a German mayor's wife. She was famously charged with witchcraft in Verden in 1647, which resulted in an intervention by Queen Christina of Sweden (Verden being then a Swedish province in Germany) banning witch trials in the Swedish province in Germany.

== Life ==
Catharine Wolpmann was born in Verden in about 1603 as the daughter of Engel Wehland and Woldeke Wehland. Woldeke Wehland was the incumbent mayor of Verden from 1626 to 1628. The Wehland family operated cloth trading and made robes. Catharine's mother, Engel Wehland (née Panning), was the sister of councillor Franz Panning. He had a daughter named Hilke (Hille) Badenhop.

Catharine married the next mayor, Hermann Wolpmann, in 1620, who was in office from 1643 to 1659, and had 6 children with him. The Wolpmann family lived in 75 Grosse Strasse in Verden. Her mother (house number 65) and her uncle (house number 71) lived on the same street. In addition, a farm in Borstel called "Reisens" was owned by the Wolpmanns.

=== First witch trial ===
Catharine Wolpmann was arrested in July 1647 in Verden after some women from the neighbourhood accused her of witchcraft. During her imprisonment, Catharine could not have a defence attorney during the interrogation, and when she was visited by her family, someone from the magistrate was always present.

Her family members pulled out all the stops to get her out of custody. They requested bail for the detainee. Since this was not immediately confirmed, Franz's son filed a complaint with the provisional government in Stade at the end of August. However, nothing changed in her situation.

In September, however, Swedish councillors ordered the cathedral chapter and the magistrate of Norderstadt to release her on bail under threat of a fine of 1,000 gold guilders. In the end, the Swedish Queen Christina ordered that they should release her from custody. After her release in 1649, she was forbidden from bringing charges against the city because of her detention.

=== Second witch trial ===
Catharine Wolpmann and her husband, Hermann Wolpmann, were accused of witchcraft in 1655 and arrested.

However, as in the first trial, she was acquitted and released in 1659, so they won the trial against the pastor of St. Andreas Erich Warner Oporinus.

== Literature ==
- Christoph Gottlieb Pfannkuche: Die aeltere und neuere Geschichte des vormaligen Bisthums Verden. Volume 1. Bauer, Verden 1830; Reprint: Nabu Press 2012, pp. 319–326 (limited preview in Google Book search).
