= Thedinghausen (Samtgemeinde) =

- Samtgemeinde
- Location of Thedinghausen within Verden district
- Interactive map of Thedinghausen
- Location within Germany Location within Lower Saxony
- Coordinates: 52°58′N 9°01′E
- Country: Germany
- State: Lower Saxony
- District: Verden
- Seat: Thedinghausen
- Subdivisions: 4 municipalities

Area
  - Total: 152.61 km^{2} (58.92 sq mi)

Population (2025-12-31)
  - Total: 15,583
  - Density: 102.11/km^{2} (264.46/sq mi)
- Time zone: UTC+01:00 (CET)
  - Summer (DST): UTC+02:00 (CEST)
- Website: www.thedinghausen.de

Thedinghausen is a Samtgemeinde ("collective municipality") in the district of Verden, in Lower Saxony, Germany. Its seat is in the village Thedinghausen. Until 1972 the incorporated municipalities had been an exclave of the district Braunschweig.

The Samtgemeinde Thedinghausen consists of the following municipalities:

1. Blender
2. Emtinghausen
3. Riede
4. Thedinghausen
