= Achim =

- Town
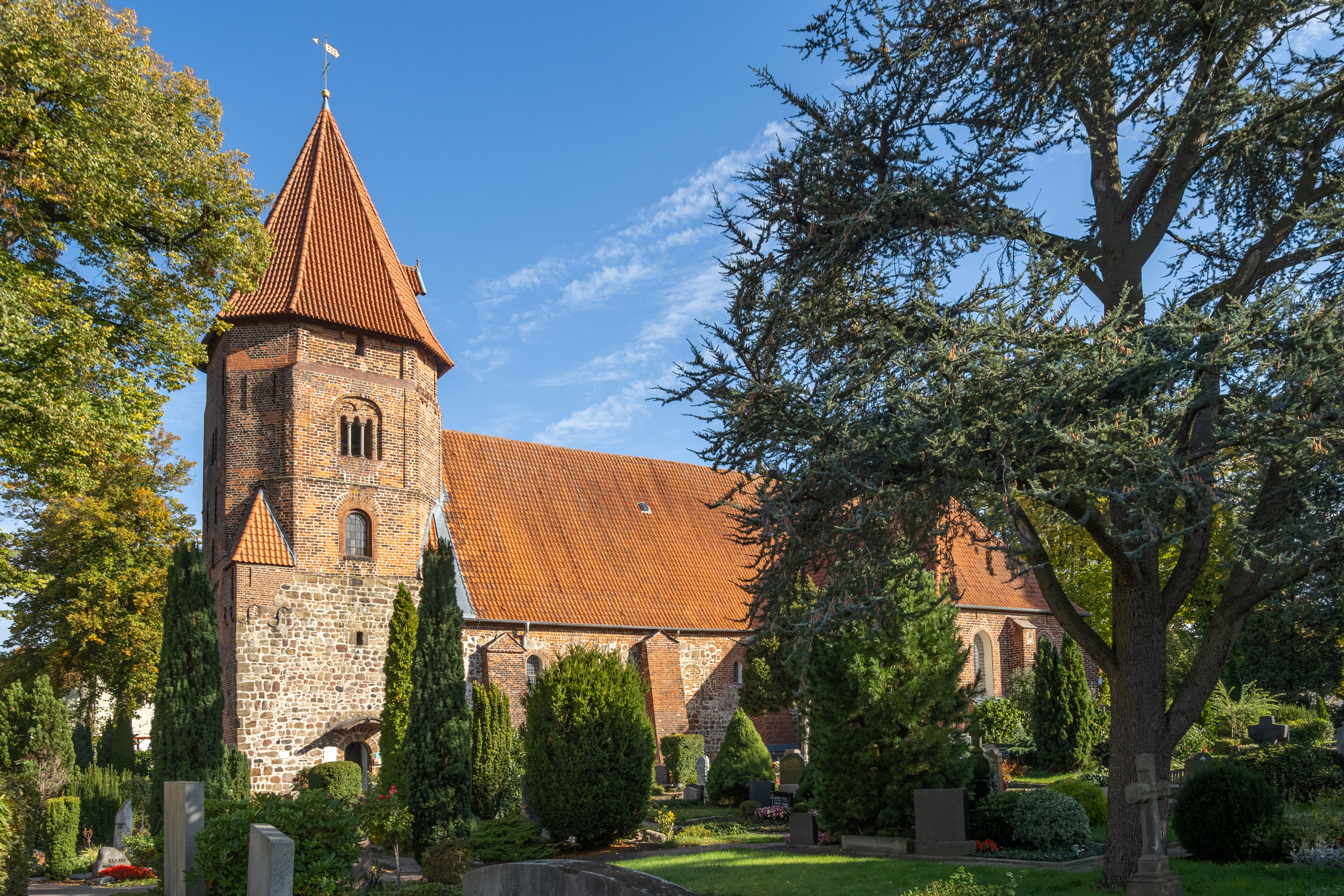
- Saint Lawrence's Church, 12th c.

- Flag Coat of arms

- Location of Achim within Verden district
- Interactive map of Achim
- Location within Germany Location within Lower Saxony
- Coordinates: 53°03′55″N 09°02′03″E
- Country: Germany
- State: Lower Saxony
- District: Verden
- Subdivisions: 9 districts

Government
  - Mayor (2021–26): Rainer Ditzfeld

Area
  - Total: 68.06 km^{2} (26.28 sq mi)
- Elevation: 15 m (49 ft)

Population (2025-12-31)
  - Total: 32,913
  - Density: 483.6/km^{2} (1,252/sq mi)
- Time zone: UTC+01:00 (CET)
  - Summer (DST): UTC+02:00 (CEST)
- Postal codes: 28832
- Dialling codes: 04202
- Vehicle registration: VER

Achim (German pronunciation: [ˈaxɪm]; Northern Low Saxon: Achem), commonly Achim bei Bremen, is a municipality and the largest town (population 30,059 in December 2006) in the district of Verden, in Lower Saxony, Germany. It is situated on the right bank of the Weser, approx. 17 km northwest of Verden, and 16 km southeast of Bremen.

== Geography ==
Achim lies in the Weser Depression, an Urstromtal. The area surrounding Achim is primarily moorland in its natural state. It has an elevation between 12 and 40 metres above sea level, and an area of 65.1 km^{2}.

For the Badener mountains and Oil Camp, see Baden, Lower Saxony.

== History ==
The first recorded mention of Achim came in 1091 as Arahem. The controlling heights of the Linden Mountains, south of Bremen, on which the old Arahem leaned, was a cult- and court-location. Achim was a meeting place of old Saxon courts. The court met three times annually.

The Christian missionaries erected a baptismal church in Achim in the 12th century; it was the predecessor of St. Laurentius Church in Achim, built in 1257. It then belonged to the Prince-Archbishopric of Bremen.

During the course of the War of the Lunenburgian Succession (1370–1388), Achim was set on fire in 1381 because of the fights between Duke Albrecht of Saxe-Wittenberg, Duke-designate of Brunswick and Lunenburg, and the Prince-Archbishop of Bremen, Albert II, titular Duke of Brunswick and Lunenburg.

From 1626 Achim was controlled alternately by Danes and Swedes. In 1648 the Prince-Archbishopric was transformed into the Duchy of Bremen, which was first ruled in personal union by the Swedish Crown and — interrupted by a Danish occupation (1712–1715) — from 1715 on by the House of Hanover. During the Third Silesian or Seven Years' War (precipitated by the Anglo-French and Indian War) it was controlled by France. In 1807 the ephemeric Kingdom of Westphalia annexed the Duchy of Bremen, including Achim, before France annexed it in 1810. Achim became the capital of a homonymous canton within the Département des Bouches-du-Weser. In 1813 the Duchy was restored to the Electorate of Hanover. In 1814 the Electorate was upgraded to the Kingdom of Hanover at the Congress of Vienna. In 1823 Hanover incorporated the Duchy in a real union and the ducal territory, including Achim, became part of the Stade Region, established in 1823.

A train station has existed in Achim since 1847. Achim lies along the track between Bremen and Hannover.

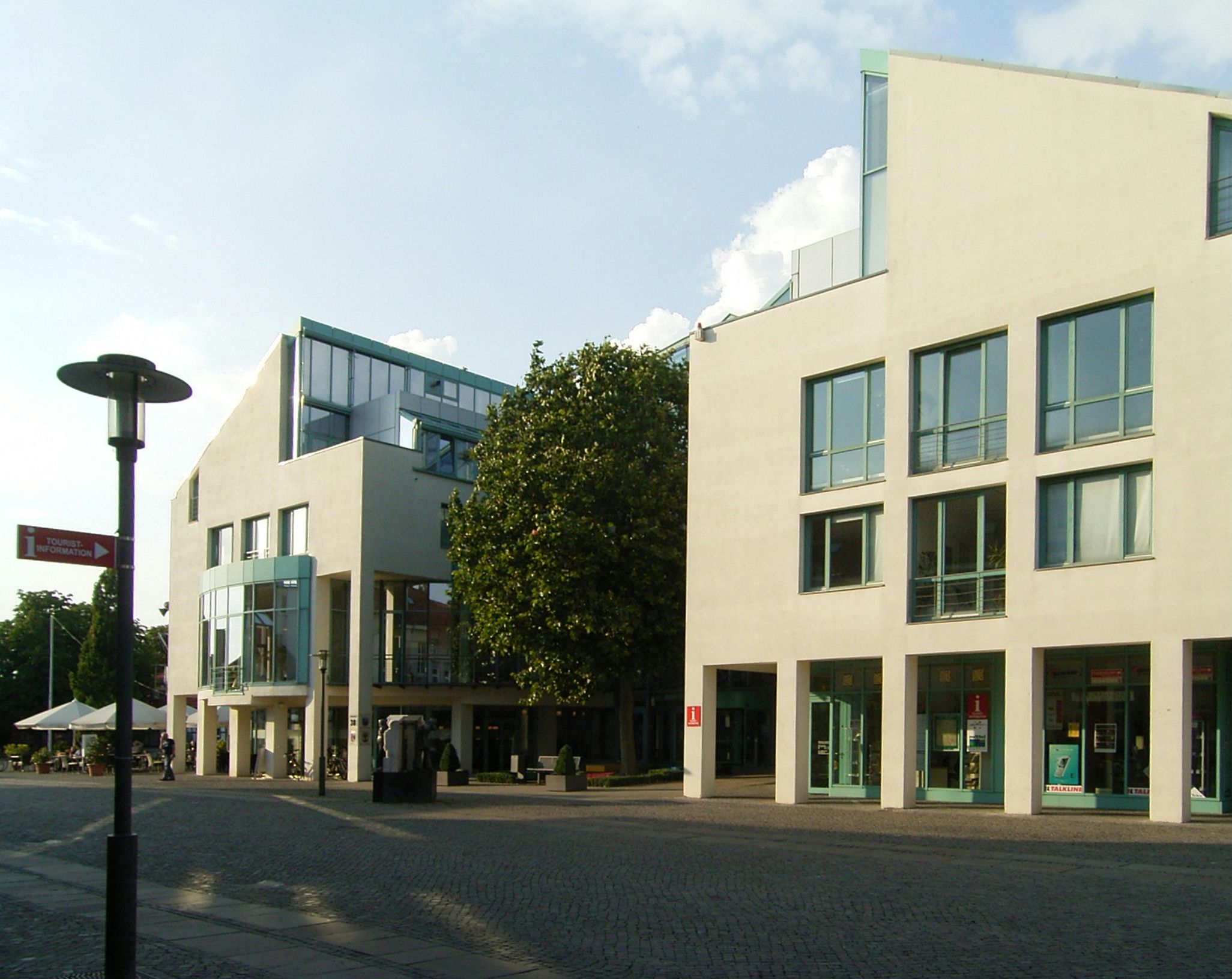
Achim town hall

=== Industry ===
Achim is home to several international companies including Vitakraft and Desma shoe machines. Mercedes-Benz, Coca-Cola and Amazon.com, Inc. also have branch offices in the city.

=== Jewish Cemetery ===
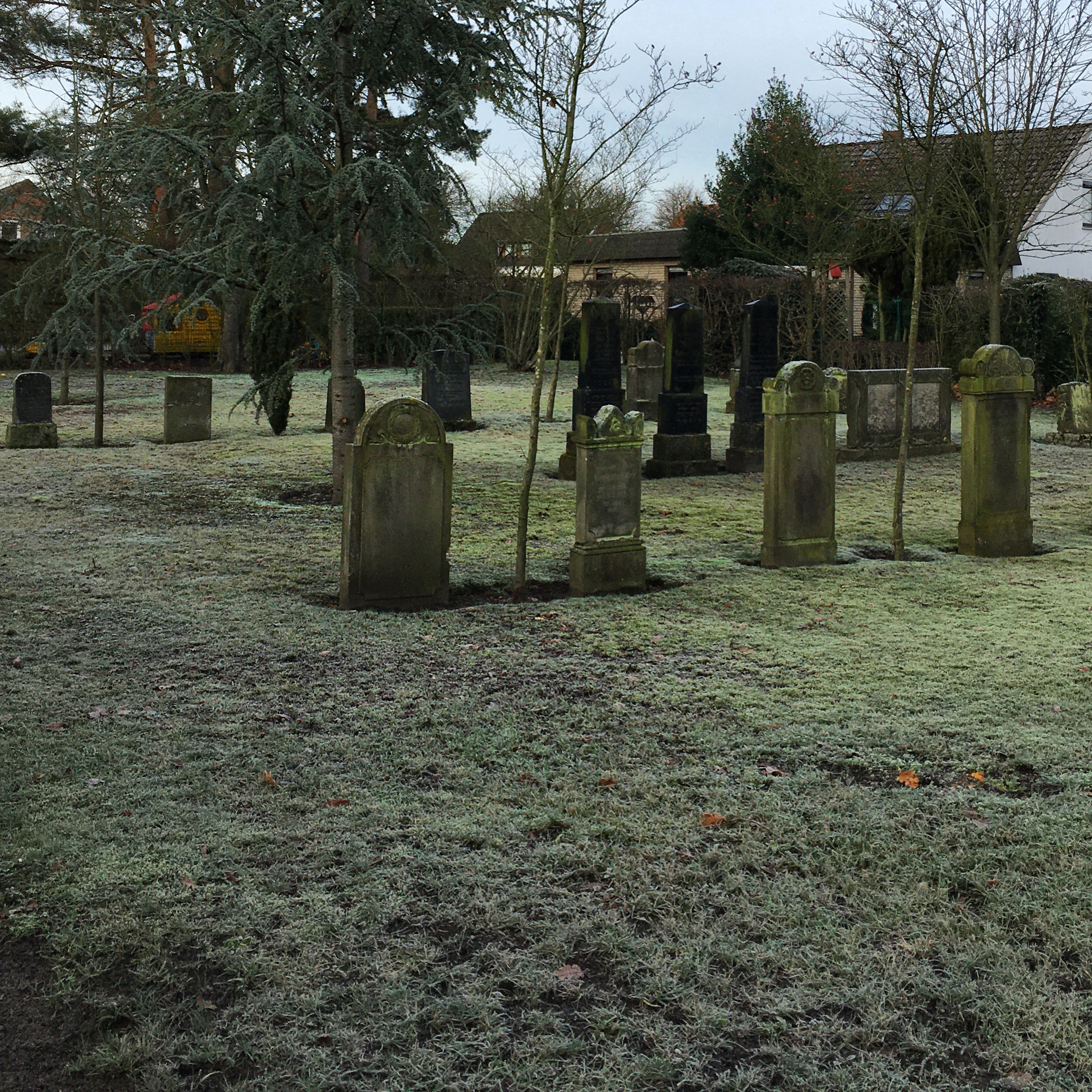

The Jewish Cemetery in Achim, located on the street "An der Bahn," contains 56 gravestones for Jews from Achim and the surrounding area who died between 1867 and 1935. The cemetery is a listed cultural monument.

== Twin towns – sister cities ==
Achim is twinned with:

- Cēsis, Latvia
- Nowa Sól, Poland

== Notable people ==
Notable people that were born or lived in Achim include:

- Friedrich Wilhelm Kleukens (1878–1956), German graphic designer and typographer
- Christian Heinrich Kleukens (1880–1954), calligrapher and poet
- Carl Huneke (1898–1972), German-American master stained glass artist and craftsman
- Karl Ravens (1927–2017), German politician (SPD), former federal minister

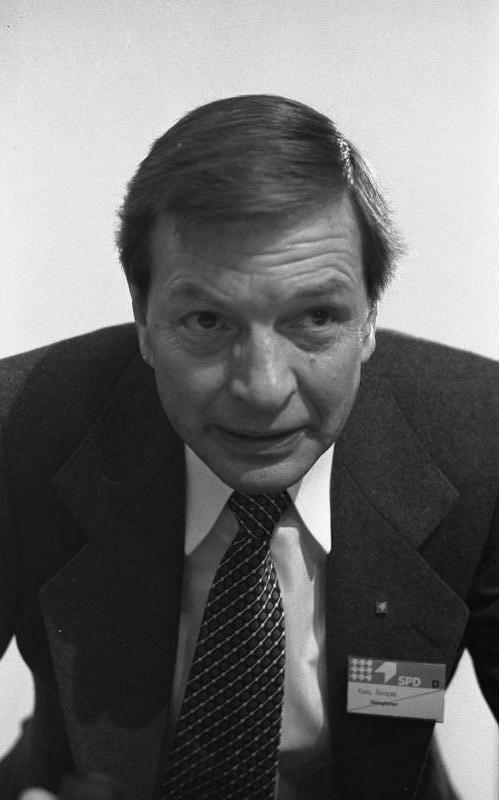
Karl Ravens Cologne 1978

- Fritz-Heiner Hepke (born 1947), politician (SPD), 1998-2003 deputy in the state parliament of Lower Saxony
- Heinz Emigholz (born 1948), filmmaker, actor, artist, writer and producer
- Martin Schmidt (born 1969), handball player
- Matthias Weidenhöfer (born 1985), German actor
- Felix Wiedwald (born 1990), football player
- Deniz Undav (born 1996), football player
