= Verden, Aller =

Verden (Aller)
- Town
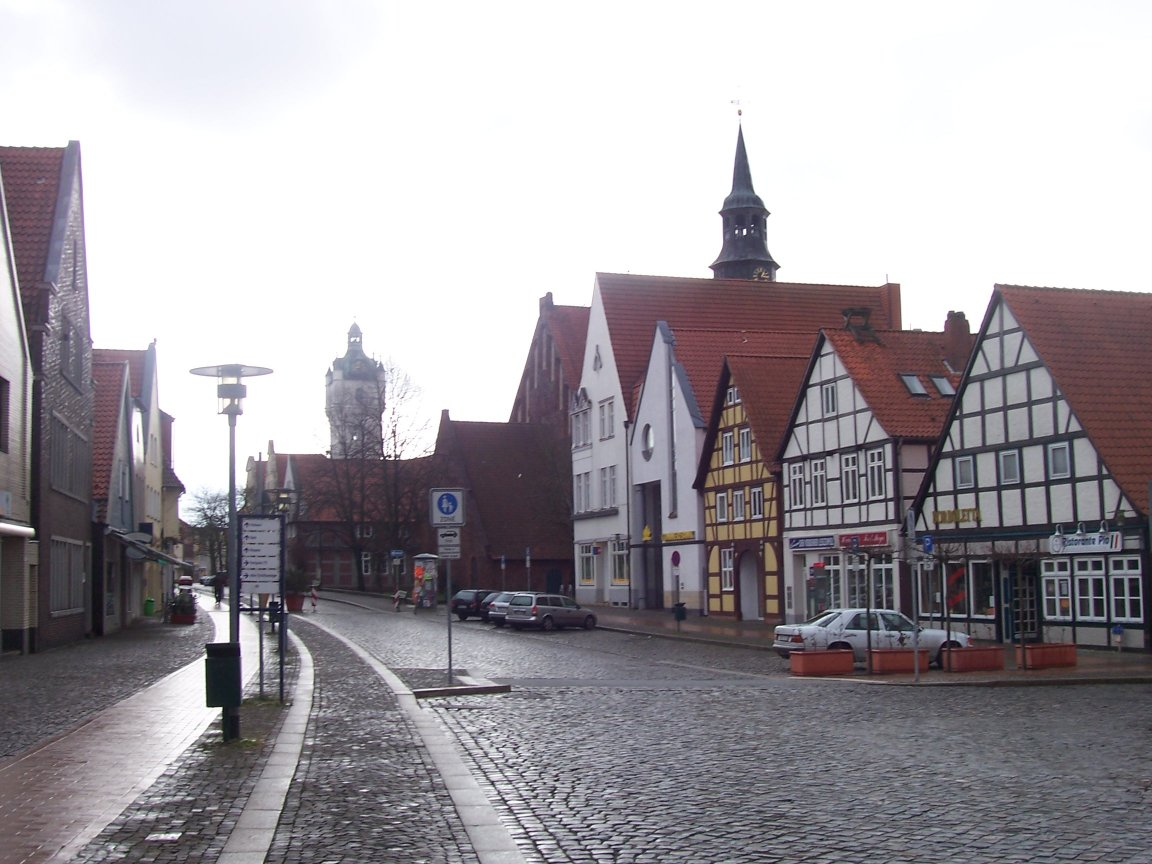

- Flag Coat of arms

- Location of Verden (Aller) within Verden district
- Interactive map of Verden (Aller)
- Location within Germany Location within Lower Saxony
- Coordinates: 52°55′24″N 9°14′06″E
- Country: Germany
- State: Lower Saxony
- District: Verden
- Subdivisions: 7 districts

Government
  - Mayor (2019–24): Lutz Brockmann (SPD)

Area
  - Total: 71.7 km^{2} (27.7 sq mi)
- Elevation: 20 m (66 ft)

Population (2025-12-31)
  - Total: 27,273
  - Density: 380/km^{2} (985/sq mi)
- Time zone: UTC+01:00 (CET)
  - Summer (DST): UTC+02:00 (CEST)
- Postal codes: 27283
- Dialling codes: 04231
- Vehicle registration: VER
- Website: www.verden.de

Verden an der Aller (German: [ˈfeːɐ̯dn̩ ʔan dɐ ˈʔalɐ]; Northern Low Saxon: Veern), also called Verden (Aller) or simply Verden, is a town in Lower Saxony, Germany, on the river Aller. It is the district town of the district of Verden in Lower Saxony and an independent municipality (de:Selbständige Gemeinde). The town is located in the middle Weser region on the Aller river immediately before it flows into the Weser. As a center of horse breeding and equestrian sports, it bears the nickname "equestrian town". The suffix "Aller" was introduced because the name "Verden" was also used in German to refer to the French town of Verdun. The town name comes from "ford" or "ferry". The town was conveniently located at a ford through the Aller river, near an important trade route.

Verden is famous for a massacre of Saxons in 782, committed on the orders of Charlemagne (the Massacre of Verden), for its cathedral, and for its horse-breeding.

== History ==
In the Early Middle Ages (year 782) there was a massacre of allegedly 4,500 Saxons, by order of Charlemagne because of their involvement in a preceding uprising. Verden was then within the Duchy of Saxony.

After a coalition of Emperor Frederick I Barbarossa and his allies had defeated the then Saxo-Bavarian Duke Henry the Lion in 1180, Henry was subsequently stripped of his duchies. Saxony was divided among the members of the imperial coalition and so the Catholic Bishop of Verden gained imperial immediacy for parts of his diocesan territory, thus establishing the Prince-Bishopric of Verden.

On 12 March 1259 Prince-Bishop Gerhard of Verden granted the place town privileges following the Bremian version of German town law. In the 15th century Verden gained considerable independence as a Free Imperial City, immediately under the emperors (imperial immediacy), circumventing its former overlords the prince-bishops, who still held the cathedral and pertaining premises in town as a cathedral immunity district.

By the Peace of Westphalia the city of Verden was mediatised as regular city again within the Prince-Bishopric of Verden, which was transformed by the same contract into the Principality of Verden in May 1648. The northern city (with the town hall and St. John's church) and the southern town (with the proto-cathedral) were then united to form one city.

In 1675, during the Swedish-Brandenburg War, Verden was conquered by several states of the Holy Roman Empire and Denmark following the Bremen-Verden Campaign and remained in allied hands until the end of the war in 1679. In the wake of the Treaty of Saint-Germain in 1679, Verden was returned to Sweden.

The Principality of Verden was first ruled in personal union by the Swedish Crown – interrupted by a Danish occupation (1712–1715) – and from 1715 on by the Hanoverian Crown. The Kingdom of Hanover incorporated the principality in a real union and the princely territory, including Verden upon Aller, became part of the new Stade Region, established in 1823.

Until the Second World War, Verden was renowned for its trade and crafts and also its mounted division. During the Nazi regime forced-labourers were used in a furniture factory in Verden. Between 1945 and 1949 Verden was part of the British zone of occupation. Refugees from the former Prussian provinces of East Prussia, Pomerania and Silesia, settled in and around the town.

With the labour immigration from the East German Democratic Republic inhibited by the Berlin Wall foreign workers (Gastarbeiter) started to arrive from southern Europe and Anatolia in the 1960s. After the fall of Communism more immigrants arrived from Eastern Europe.

From 1945 until 1960, the 5th Division, of the British Army of the Rhine, was stationed in Verden. In 1960, the division was renamed as the 1st Division (later 1st Armoured Division). One of the former British barracks is now used to house the Kreisverwaltung (district administration) and a new sporting stadium has been erected opposite. The second barracks has been demolished to make way for a new residential estate.

== Geography ==
Verden is located in the German state of Lower Saxony, on the river Aller. It is the administrative centre of the district of Verden. The nearest large cities are Bremen (35 km or 22 mi) and Hannover (90 km or 56 mi).

== Sights ==
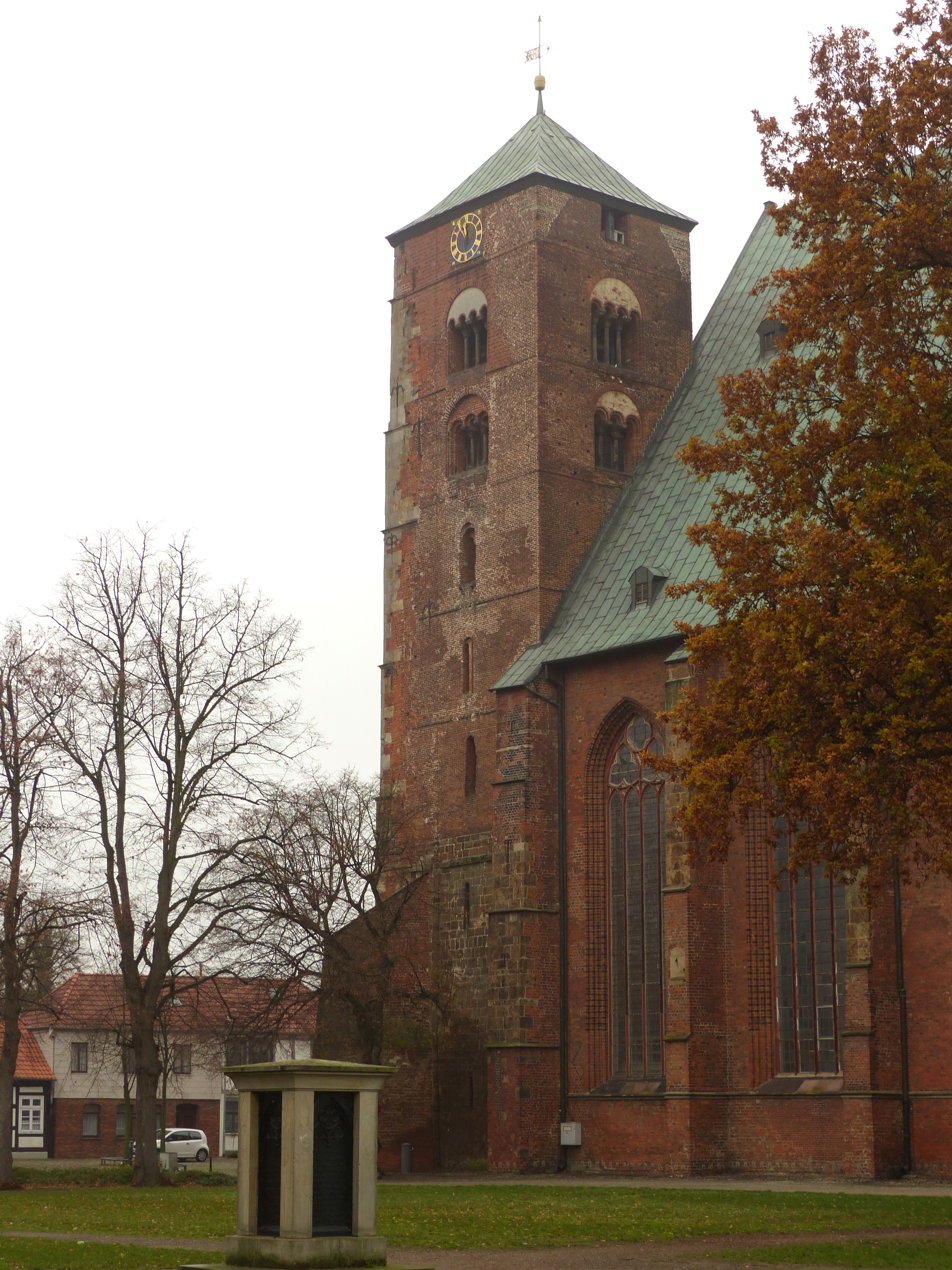
Cathedral tower, c.1160, possibly the first brick construction in north-west Germany

The old town lies east of the Aller. The Lutheran cathedral (German: Dom) is known as the Dom zu Verden and towers above the pedestrianised high street, with its cafés and shops. This proto-cathedral, consecrated to Ss. Mary and Cecilia, served the former Catholic Diocese of Verden as episcopal church and was built between the 12th and 15th centuries. Other noteworthy buildings include the Lutheran churches of St. John and of St. Andrew, as well as the town hall and the Domherrenhaus (House of cathedral canons).

Verden is further renowned for horse racing and sport horse auctions and is thus also called the (horse) riding town (German: Reiterstadt).

== Infrastructure ==
East of Verden, there is the 225 metres (738 ft) tall radio transmitter, Sender Verden, used by Deutsche Telekom primarily for TV and mobile phone broadcasting.

in 2009, the derelict fodder silo towering over the town won the prize of being "The ugliest wall in North Germany" in a Radio Bremen Vier competition. The prize was to be decorated with a large mural by graffiti artists Markus Genesius and Stefan of WOW123. The mural can now be seen above the town skyline.

Mars Petcare has its largest pet food factory in Europe, with a large research centre similar to the Waltham Petcare Science Institute in the UK.

== Twin towns – sister cities ==
Verden is twinned with:

- Bagrationovsk, Russia
- Bartoszyce County, Poland
- Górowo Iławeckie, Poland
- Gmina Górowo Iławeckie, Poland
- Havelberg, Germany
- Saumur, France
- Warwick, England, United Kingdom
- Zielona Góra, Poland

== Notable people ==
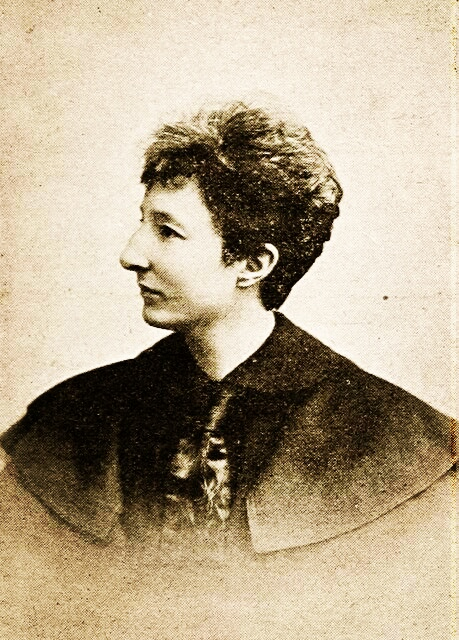
Anita Augspurg, 1902

- Catharine Wolpmann (1603 – fl. 1659), twice charged locally with witchcraft, in 1647 and 1655 and twice acquitted
- F. C. D. Wyneken (1810–1876), missionary pastor in the United States
- Marcus Lehmann (1831–1890), Orthodox rabbi
- Anita Augspurg (1857–1943), jurist, actress, writer, activist of the radical feminist movement and pacifist
- Adolf Köster (1883–1930), politician (SPD), Foreign Minister (1920) and Interior Minister (1921–1922).
- Gerhard Lindemann (1896–1994), Generalmajor
- Gottfried Graf von Bismarck-Schönhausen (1901–1949), politician and grandson of Otto von Bismarck, died locally
- Hanna Grages (1922–2010), gymnast, competed at the 1952 Summer Olympics
- Volker Münz (born 1964), politician (AfD), member of the Bundestag, 2017 to 2021.
- Hille Perl (born 1965), virtuoso player of the viola da gamba
- Jan Hendrik Schön (born 1970), German physicist and fraud

== Gallery ==
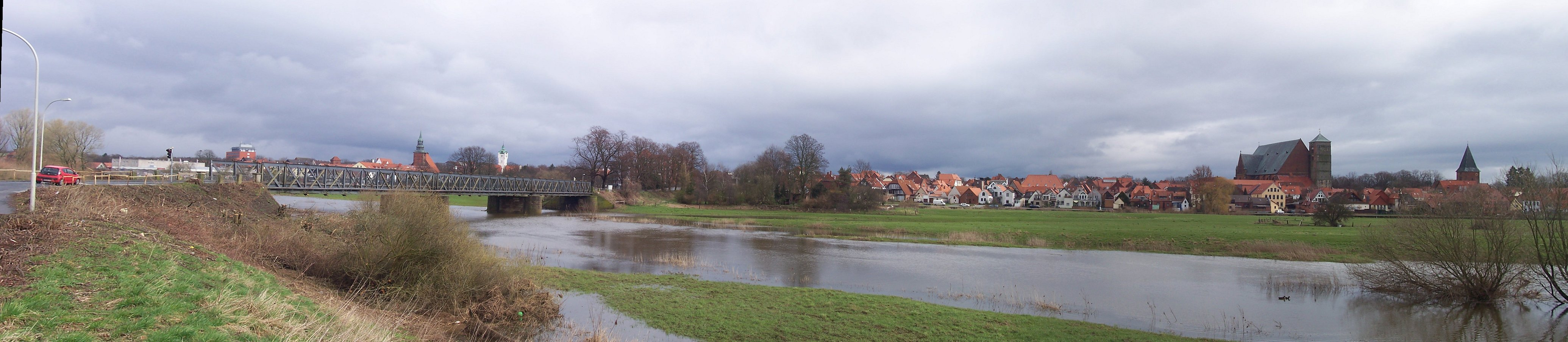
Aller river at Verden
