= Verden (district) =

District in Lower Saxony, Germany

Coordinates: 53°00′N 9°10′E

- District
- Flag Coat of arms
- Country: Germany
- State: Lower Saxony
- Capital: Verden

Government
  - District admin.: Peter Bohlmann (SPD)

Area
  - Total: 787.70 km^{2} (304.13 sq mi)

Population (31 December 2024)
  - Total: 138,626
  - Density: 175.99/km^{2} (455.81/sq mi)
- Time zone: UTC+01:00 (CET)
  - Summer (DST): UTC+02:00 (CEST)
- Vehicle registration: VER
- Website: landkreis-verden.de

Verden (German pronunciation: [ˈfeːɐ̯dn̩]) is a Kreis (district) in the centre of Lower Saxony, Germany. Adjoining it are (from the northwest clockwise) the districts of Osterholz, Rotenburg, Heidekreis, Nienburg, and Diepholz, as well as the city of Bremen.

== Geography ==
The Aller River enters the district in the east and joins the Weser in the center of the district. In the north, the Wümme River passes from west to the east across the district's territory. The western half of the district is occupied by suburbs in the Bremen metropolitan area, e.g. the town of Achim.

== History ==
The district dates back to the two Ämter of Verden and Achim, which were created in 1852 and 1859. After the Kingdom of Hanover became part of Prussia, they were recreated as districts (Kreise), and merged in 1932. In 1939, two municipalities of the district were added to Bremen, and in 1972 Thedinghausen (previously an exclave of the district of Braunschweig) was added.

== Twin cities ==
- The city and rayon of Bagrationovsk (Russia)
- The city and municipality of Górowo Ilaweckie (Poland)

== Coat of arms ==
The coat of arms shows a horse in the top part, both as a symbol for the state of Lower Saxony, as well as the historical state of Hanover, to which the district belonged. The wavy line in the middle stands for the rivers Weser and Aller, while the three ears in the bottom symbolize the agricultural character of the district.

Blazon

"Shield Azure parted by a bar wavy Argent, above a horse passant Argent, beneath three grain ears in fan flanked by two grain leaves all Or."

== Towns and municipalities ==
Clickable map of towns and municipalities in the district

Towns
1. Achim
2. Verden
Municipalities
1. Dörverden
2. Kirchlinteln
3. Langwedel
4. Ottersberg
5. Oyten
Samtgemeinde of Thedinghausen
1. Blender
2. Emtinghausen
3. Riede
4. Thedinghausen
