= Rahden-Diepenau Geest =

Coordinates: 52°23′55″N 8°36′35″E

The Rahden-Diepenau Geest (German: Rahden-Diepenauer Geest) is a natural region in the extreme northeast of North Rhine-Westphalia and in the neighbouring state of Lower Saxony in north Germany. It includes the overwhelmingly gently rolling geest between the Lübbecker Lößland to the south, the Diepholz Moor Depression to the north, the Middle Weser Valley to the east and the western Wiehen Hills and Bersenbrück Land to the west. The Rahden-Diepenau Geest is part of the Dümmer Geest Depression and thus belongs to the North German Plain, although they include foothills of the Central Uplands in the shape of the Stemmer Berge.

== Political divisions ==
In the North Rhine-Westphalian district of Minden-Lübbecke, the municipalities of Espelkamp, and most of Rahden and Stemwede as well as part of Hille and Petershagen lie within this region.

In the Lower Saxon district of Nienburg the region contains most of the municipalities of Diepenau and Warmsen and smaller elements of Raddestorf, and in the district of Osnabrück, most of Bohmte lies within the geest region.

== Sources ==
- Meynen, Emil (Ed.): Handbuch der naturräumlichen Gliederung Deutschlands. Selbstverlag der Bundesanstalt für Landeskunde, Remagen 1959-1962 (Teil 2, enthält Lieferung 6-9).
