= Marklohe (Samtgemeinde) =

Coordinates: 52.667°N 9.167°E

Marklohe is a former Samtgemeinde ("collective municipality") in the district of Nienburg, in Lower Saxony, Germany. Its seat was in the village Marklohe. It was disbanded on 1 November 2021, when it was merged with the Samtgemeinde Liebenau to form the new Samtgemeinde Weser-Aue.

The Samtgemeinde Marklohe consisted of the following municipalities:

1. Balge
2. Marklohe
3. Wietzen
