= Bundesstraße 209 =

Federal highway in Germany

B 209
- Bundesstraße 209
- B209

Route information
- Length: 134 km (83 mi)

Major junctions
- Southwest end: Nienburg/Weser district
- Northeast end: Herzogtum Lauenburg

Location
- Country: Germany
- States: Lower Saxony, Schleswig-Holstein

Highway system
- Roads in Germany; Autobahns; List; Federal; List; State; E-roads

Bundesstraße 209 (B 209) is a German federal road that runs from Nienburg/Weser district in Lower Saxony to Schwarzenbek in the district of Herzogtum Lauenburg, Schleswig-Holstein.

== Route ==
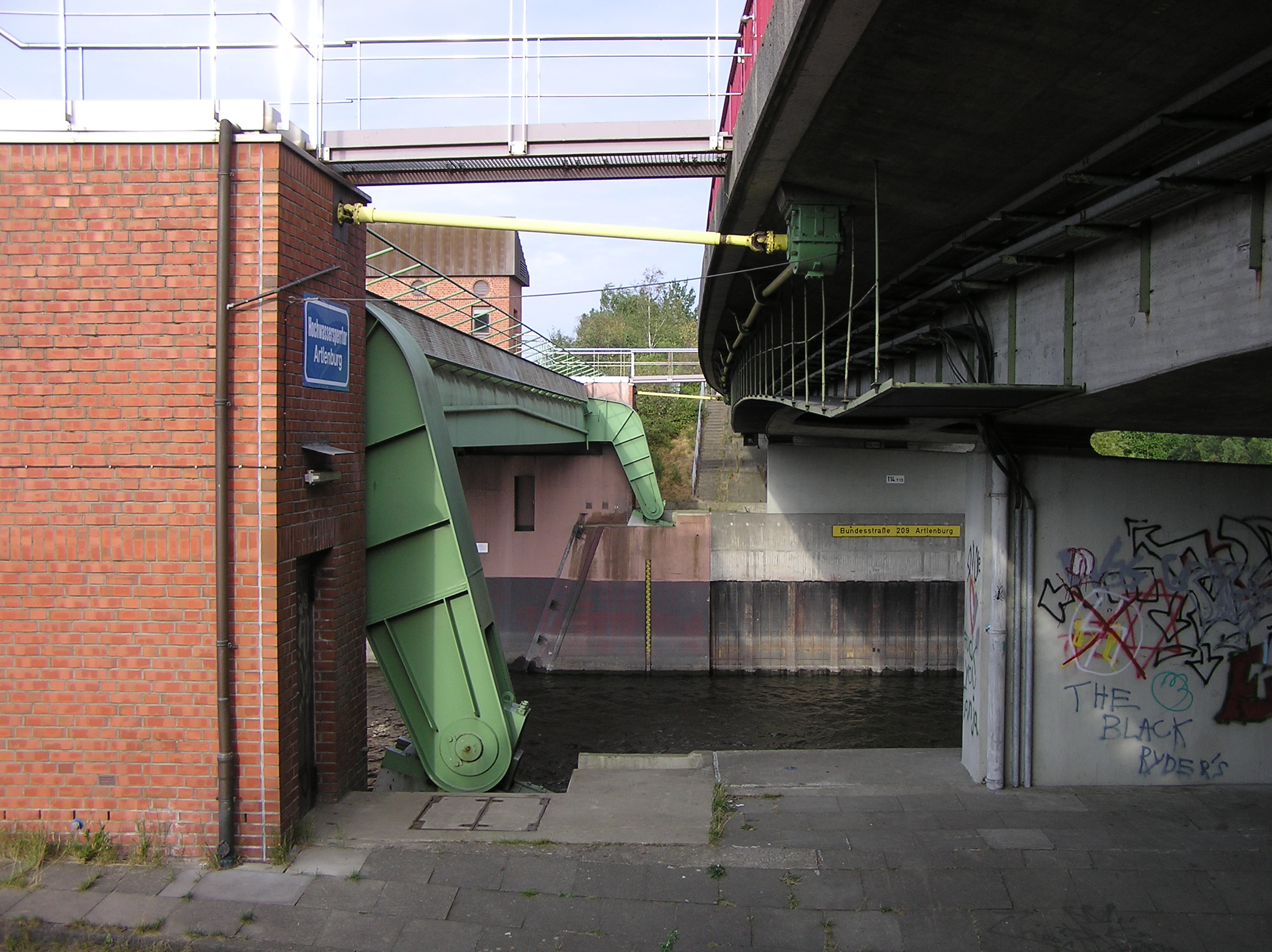
B 209 - bridge over the Elbe Lateral Canal with barrier below

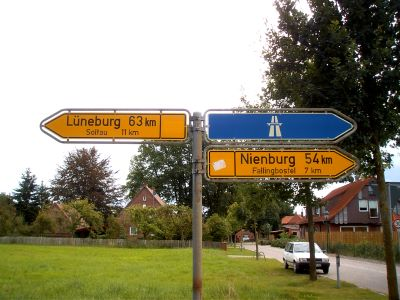
Ehemalige B 209 zwischen Bad Fallingbostel und Soltau

The B 209 begins in Nienburg/Weser district between the villages of Rohrsen and Drakenburg on the B 215 and runs in a northeasterly direction past the villages of Heemsen and Anderten.

After crossing the river Aller at Rethem in Soltau-Fallingbostel district it passes through the villages of Groß Eilstorf and Kirchboitzen before entering the one-way system in the town centre of Walsrode. This is a traffic bottleneck which causes delays during the rush hour.

The B 209 then passes through Honerdingen, before reaching junction 47 on the A 7 autobahn located in Bad Fallingbostel's industrial estate.

East of Soltau by the B 71 to Munster, the B 209 then turns northeast again towards Amelinghausen and continues from there to Lüneburg. Near Artlenburg the B 209 crosses the Elbe Lateral Canal, the bridge being combined with a barrier.

Near Lauenburg the B 209 crosses the Elbe, passes over the B 5 and runs finally into Schwarzenbek, where it meets the B 207 and B 404.

== History ==
To 1 July 1989 a section between Bad Fallingbostel and Soltau, part of the present day L 163 state road, was designated as Bundesstraße 209. As a result of the parallel routing of the A 7 autobahn, this section was downgraded however. In Bad Fallingbostel the autobahn slip road (then an independent branch) to the A 7 was designated the B 209a. When the road between Bad Fallingbostel and Soltau was downgraded on 1 July 1989 the slip road became part of the B 209. Its distance is separately measured however.

== Junction lists ==
Legend:

- I/C - Interchange, I/S - Intersection, RSA - Rest and service area, OBR - Overhead bridge restaurant, R/R - Restaurant and rest plaza, L/B - Layby, V/P - Vista point, TN - tunnel, T/P - Toll plaza, BR - Bridge
- C - Cloverleaf, S - Stack, T-A - Trumpet-A, T-B - Trumpet-B, DT - Directional-T/Y, SDT - Semi-Directional-T/Y, P-Y - Partial-Y, D - Diamond, P-C - Partial cloverleaf, D-D - Diverging diamond, D-R - Direct ramp

	Drakenburg B 215
	Rethem (Aller)
(27)	Walsrode West A 27 E234
	Walsrode
	Bad Fallingbostel
(47)	Fallingbostel A 7 E45
	Ersetzt durch die A 7 E45
(46)	Dorfmark
(45)	Soltau-Süd
(44)	Soltau-Ost A 7 B 71 E45
	Amelinghausen
	Lüneburg local diversion B 4 B 216
	Adendorf
	Brietlingen
	Lauenburg/Elbe B 5
	Schwarzenbek B 207 B 404
