= Eystrup (Samtgemeinde) =

Coordinates: 52.776°N 9.217°E

Eystrup was a Samtgemeinde ("collective municipality") in the district of Nienburg, in Lower Saxony, Germany. Its seat was in the village Eystrup. On 1 January 2011, it merged with the Samtgemeinde Grafschaft Hoya.

The Samtgemeinde Eystrup consisted of the following municipalities:

1. Eystrup
2. Gandesbergen
3. Hämelhausen
4. Hassel
