= Liebenau (Samtgemeinde) =

Coordinates: 52.600°N 9.100°E

Liebenau is a former Samtgemeinde ("collective municipality") in the district of Nienburg, in Lower Saxony, Germany. Its seat was in the village of Liebenau. It was disbanded on 1 November 2021, when it was merged with the Samtgemeinde Marklohe to form the new Samtgemeinde Weser-Aue.

The Samtgemeinde Liebenau consisted of the following municipalities:

1. Binnen
2. Liebenau
3. Pennigsehl
