= Reese, Germany =

Hamlet in Nienburg, Lower Saxony, Germany

Coordinates: 52°35′N 9°04′E

Reese is a hamlet (Bauernschaft) in the Nienburg District (Kreise) of Lower Saxony in northwestern Germany, between Steyerberg and the town of Liebenau on the River Aue. It is part of the Liebenau municipality.

== History ==
There is an old Saxon cemetery in Reese dating from before 800 A.D., with graves perhaps as early at the First Century, with over 1,000 burials. It was excavated beginning in 1953 by the Lower Saxony State Museum in Hannover (Niedersächsisches Landesmuseum Hannover).

During World War II there was a prisoner of war camp for Soviet soldiers at Reese. Infirm POWs who could no longer work in the forced labor camps of Lower Saxony (Stalag X-C) were taken to the Reese camp where large numbers died of disease and malnutrition and were buried in mass graves nearby.
