= Lemke =

Lemke may refer to:

- Lemke (surname)
- Lemke (Marklohe), a small village in Germany
- 14327 Lemke, an asteroid

== See also ==
- Lemke's algorithm, by Carlton Lemke
