= Duddenhausen =

Coordinates: 52°47′34″N 9°5′22″E

- Village
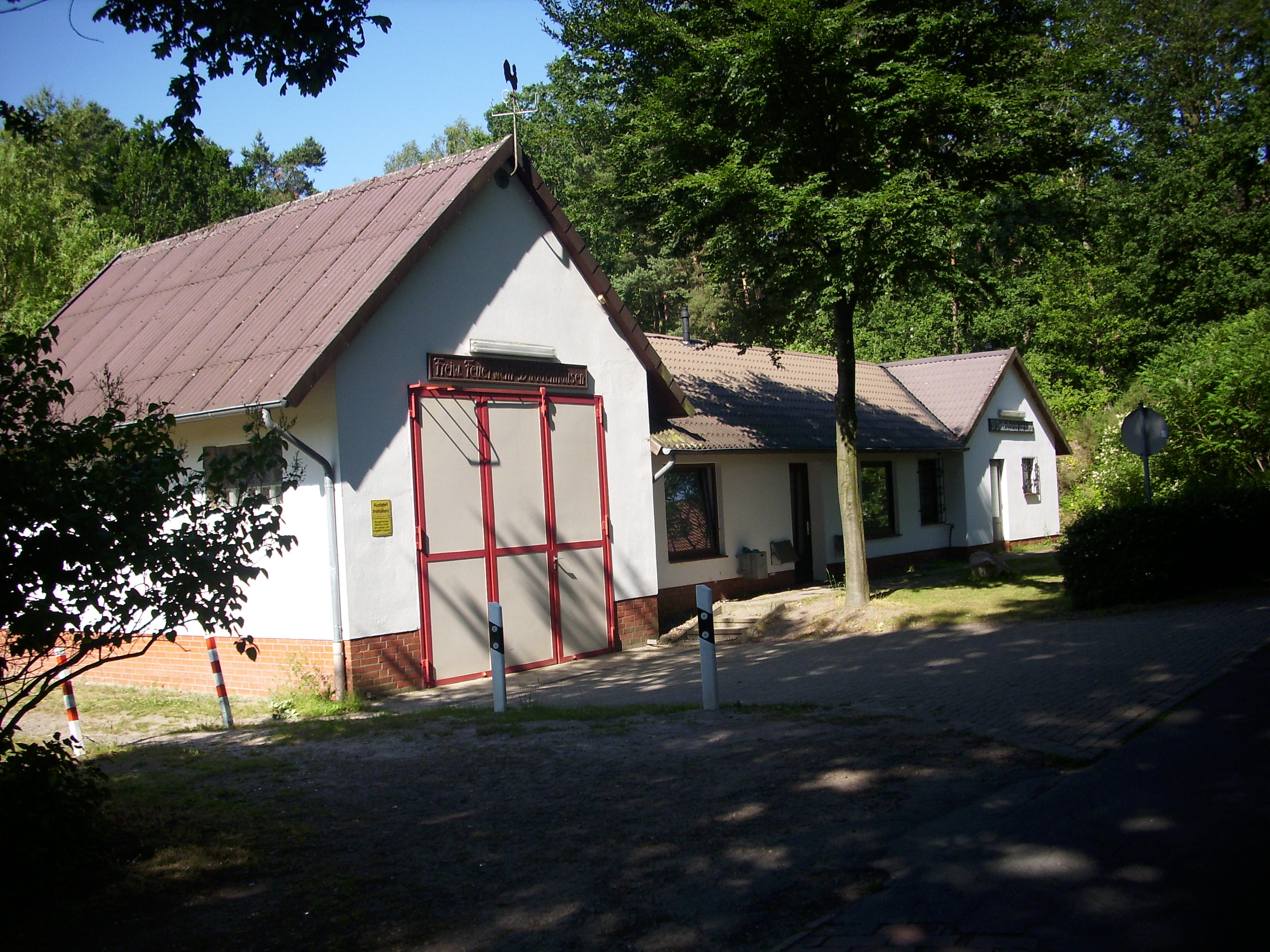
- Duddenhausen, village hall with volunteer fire station, sport club and shooting range, Bücken, Lower Saxony, Germany
- Interactive map of Duddenhausen
- Country: Germany
- State: Lower Saxony
- District: Nienburg
- Municipality: Bücken
- Established: 987

Area
  - Total: 705 ha (1,740 acres)

Population (2008)
  - Total: 300
  - Density: 43/km^{2} (110/sq mi)

Duddenhausen is a village in the municipality of Bücken, district of Nienburg, in Lower Saxony, Germany. Duddenhausen has an area of 705 hectares (7,72 square miles).

== History ==
Duddenhausen was first mentioned 987 in a document of the Archdiocese of Bremen. Tenors were possessions of the chapter of Bücken, which was found 882. The four oldest farms in Duddenhausen were always property of this cloister, so the village may be already existed 882 minimum. There are two other references for a greater age: 1) In Duddenhausen are rests of hill-graves from the bronze-age. 2) The Saxon place-name "Duddenhausen" means "Dudo's house" (Dudden= Dudo, a Saxon first name. hausen=house or houses). In Lower Saxony are these place-names-formations; a reference for villages existing before 1000.

In the 13th century a knight-family was domiciled in Duddenhausen.

Duddenhausen was situated in the County of Hoya. When the last count of Hoya died 1582, the new dominion duchy Brunswick-Lüneburg ordered a "Ratslagerbuch", a book with declarations of the farms, the farmers names, taxes and the size of arable land. At his time there were 14 farms in Duddenhausen.

In the Thirty Years' War some farms were destroyed.

Since 1706 there existed a school in Duddenhausen (closed 1969).

In 1793 there were 32 farms in Duddenhausen mentioned.

In 1840 in the Kingdom of Hanover the serfdom was abolished.

In 1940 there were 50 farms in Duddenhausen.

Until 1974, Duddenhausen was an independent municipality. Since 1974 Duddenhausen has been a district of the market-town Bücken.

Official population numbers for Duddenhausen:

- 1821: 278
- 1848: 315
- 1871: 317
- 1905: 298
- 1910: 311
- 1939: 254
- 1946: 439
- 1950: 421
- 1980: 250
- 2008: 300

== Economy ==
For centuries the people were farmers. Today there are six families which are still farmers and cultivate wheat, rye, barley, avena, triticale, maize, rapeseed, sugar beet, potatoes, asparagus and bilberries. This district is very famous for asparagus. The main animals here are milk cattle and horses. 100/150 years ago the farmers had also bees, sheep and were making peat in the moor. Now the people work in Hanover, Bremen, Nienburg, Verden, Minden, Hoya, Syke. But the old farm buildings are still left. Some of them are traditionally timber framed buildings. The pupils attend schools in Bücken, Hoya and Nienburg. There are no shops and inns in Duddenhausen, but some businesses exist: an ecologic wine trade, a veterinarian, an Iceland-pony stud farm, bricklayer, wheelwright and an architecture bureau.

== Voluntary associations ==
- "Schützenverein Duddenhausen" - A Rifle Men's club with 120 members. Established 1901 for shooting sports in a rifle range.
- "Freiwillige Feuerwehr Duddenhausen" - A Volunteer fire department with 30 active members (fire fighters), 12 senior members and 50 promoting members. Established 1902.
- "Sportverein Duddenhausen" - A Sports club with soccer and handball teams. 400 members with a sports field. This Club is an official partner of the German federal league soccer club SV Werder Bremen.
