= Jewish Cemetery, Thedinghausen =

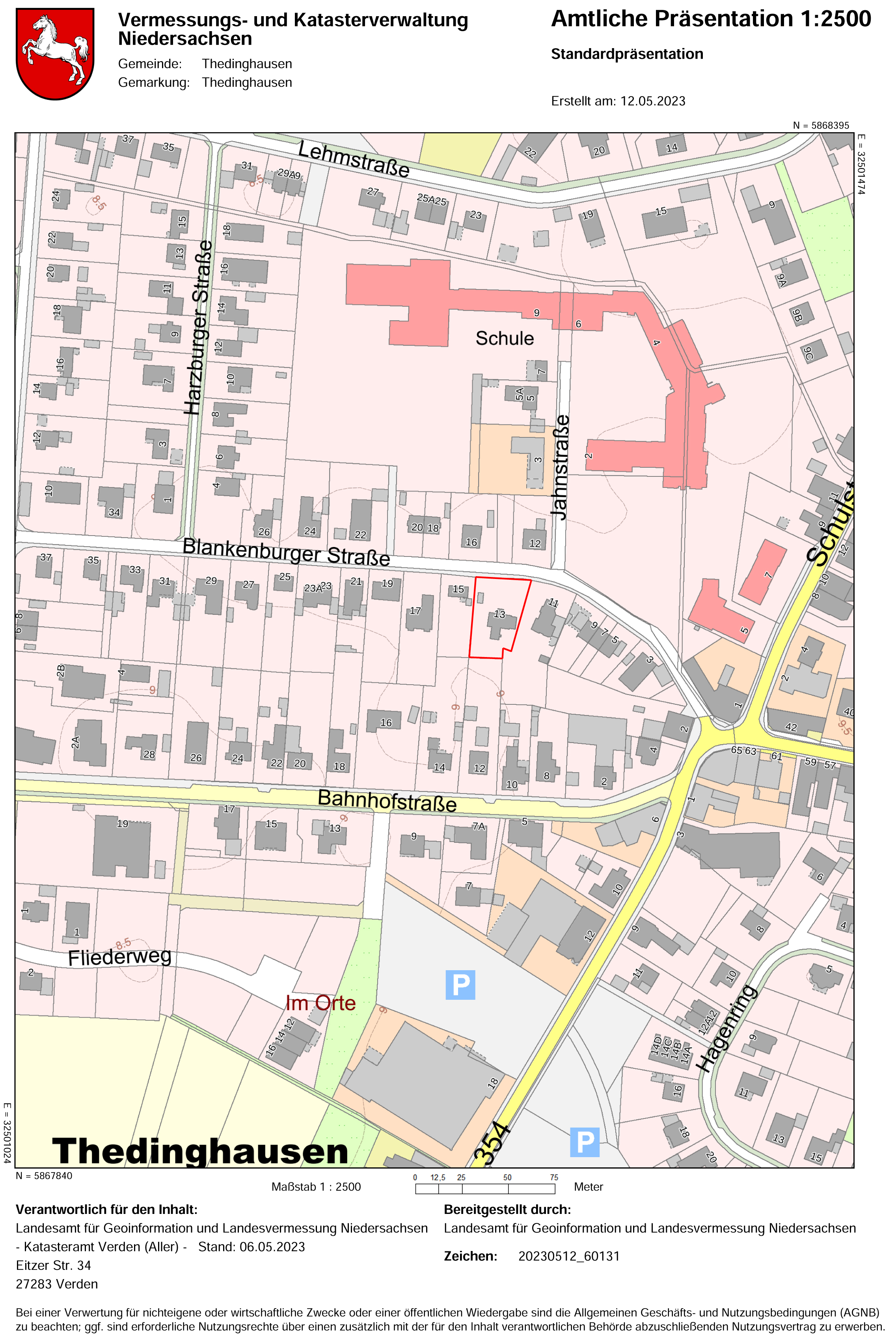
Location of the former Jewish cemetery in Thedinghausen

The Thedinghausen Jewish Cemetery was a former Jewish cemetery that existed in Thedinghausen in the Verden district of Lower Saxony from 1854 to 1941.

== Description ==
The Jewish cemetery in Thedinghausen was located on what was then the edge of the town, according to a historical town map from around 1935 (today's address: Blankenburger Straße 13).

The cemetery contained an unknown number of gravestones for people of the Jewish faith from Thedinghausen and the surrounding area who had died between 1854 and 1934. In 1942 the cemetery was completely destroyed and later built over.

== History ==
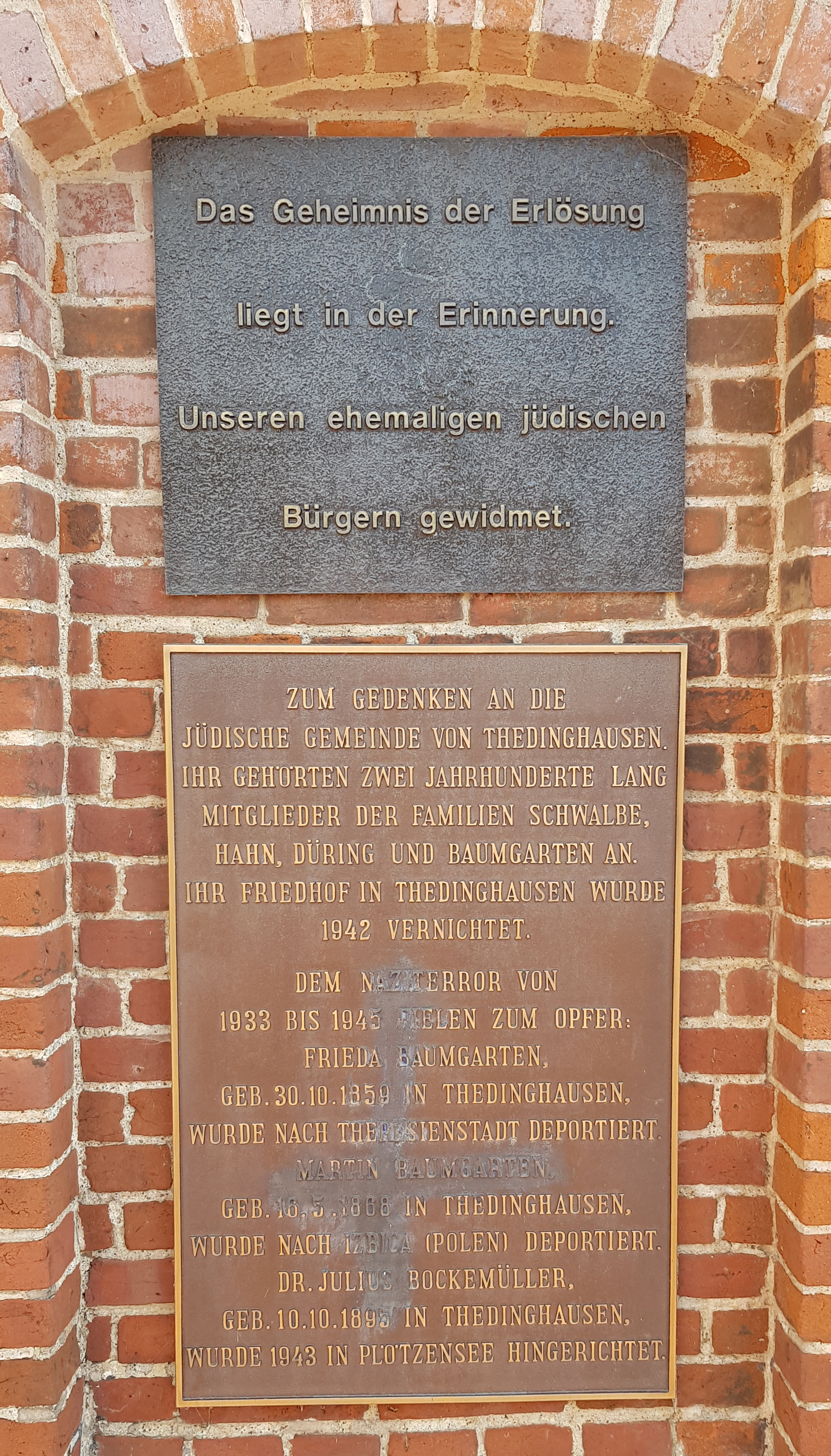
Memorial plaque on the Taubenturm (dovecote tower), on the town hall square.

Before the cemetery was established (1854), Thedinghausen's Jews were buried at the Jewish cemetery in Hoyerhagen. During Nazi rule, the Jewish cemetery in Thedinghausen was acquired by a local merchant, and a single-family house was built on the property, which still stands today. According to the inscription on a memorial plaque on the Taubenturm, located on the town hall square, the cemetery was destroyed in 1942. There is no memorial stone or Stolperstein marking the site of the former Jewish cemetery.
