= Liebenau, Lower Saxony =

Liebenau
- Municipality
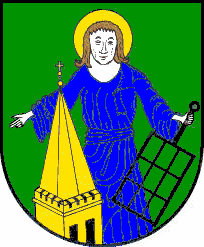
- Coat of arms

- Location of Liebenau within Nienburg/Weser district
- Interactive map of Liebenau
- Location within Germany Location within Lower Saxony
- Coordinates: 52°36′N 09°06′E
- Country: Germany
- State: Lower Saxony
- District: Nienburg/Weser
- Municipal assoc.: Weser-Aue

Government
  - Mayor: Hans-Georg Mühlenfeld (CDU)

Area
  - Total: 23.08 km^{2} (8.91 sq mi)
- Elevation: 26 m (85 ft)

Population (2025-12-31)
  - Total: 3,759
  - Density: 162.9/km^{2} (421.8/sq mi)
- Time zone: UTC+01:00 (CET)
  - Summer (DST): UTC+02:00 (CEST)
- Postal codes: 31618
- Dialling codes: 05023
- Vehicle registration: NI
- Website: www.liebenau.com

Liebenau (German pronunciation: [ˈliːbənaʊ]) is a municipality in the district of Nienburg, in Lower Saxony, Germany. It is situated on the left bank of the Weser, approx. 10 km southwest of Nienburg, and 40 km northeast of Minden.

Liebenau was the seat of the former Samtgemeinde ("collective municipality") Liebenau.

== Villages and hamlets ==
The hamlet (Bauernschaft) of Reese is in Liebenau municipality.
