= Uchte =

- Municipality
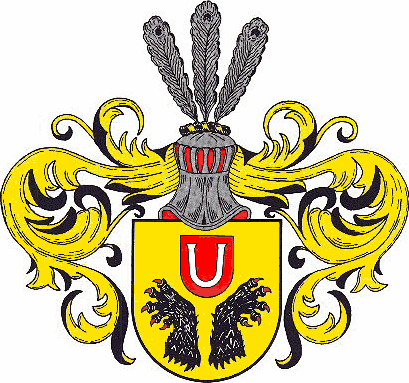
- Coat of arms

- Location of Uchte within Nienburg/Weser district
- Interactive map of Uchte
- Location within Germany Location within Lower Saxony
- Coordinates: 52°30′N 08°55′E
- Country: Germany
- State: Lower Saxony
- District: Nienburg/Weser
- Municipal assoc.: Uchte

Government
  - Mayor: Ulrich Finze (SPD)

Area
  - Total: 90.69 km^{2} (35.02 sq mi)
- Elevation: 37 m (121 ft)

Population (2025-12-31)
  - Total: 4,721
  - Density: 52.06/km^{2} (134.8/sq mi)
- Time zone: UTC+01:00 (CET)
  - Summer (DST): UTC+02:00 (CEST)
- Postal codes: 31600
- Dialling codes: 05763
- Vehicle registration: NI
- Website: www.uchte-online.de

Uchte is a municipality in the district of Nienburg, in Lower Saxony, Germany. It is situated approximately 25 km (16 mi) southwest of Nienburg, and 25 km (16 mi) north of Minden.

Uchte is also the seat of the Samtgemeinde ("collective municipality") Uchte.

== Town twinning ==
Uchte has Sourdeval, Normandy as a twin town since 1992, and Ząbkowice Śląskie since 2005.

== People ==
- Torsten Burmester (born 1963), German politician

== See also ==
- Girl of the Uchter Moor
