= Hoya, Germany =

Hoya
- Town
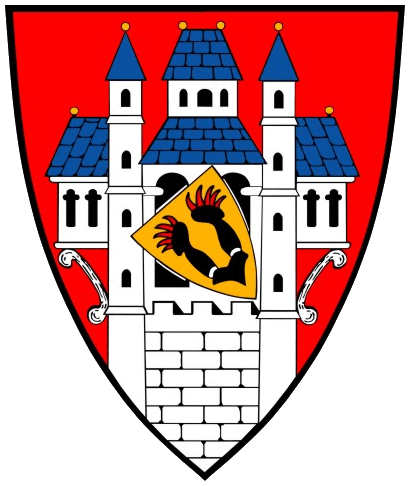
- Coat of arms

- Location of Hoya within Nienburg/Weser district
- Interactive map of Hoya
- Location within Germany Location within Lower Saxony
- Coordinates: 52°48′N 9°8′E
- Country: Germany
- State: Lower Saxony
- District: Nienburg/Weser
- Municipal assoc.: Grafschaft Hoya

Government
  - Mayor: Edmund Seidel (CDU)

Area
  - Total: 8.42 km^{2} (3.25 sq mi)
- Elevation: 14 m (46 ft)

Population (2025-12-31)
  - Total: 3,837
  - Density: 456/km^{2} (1,180/sq mi)
- Time zone: UTC+01:00 (CET)
  - Summer (DST): UTC+02:00 (CEST)
- Postal codes: 27318
- Dialling codes: 04251
- Vehicle registration: NI
- Website: www.hoya-weser.de

Hoya (German pronunciation: [ˈhoːja]) is a town in the District of Nienburg, in Lower Saxony, Germany. It is situated on the left and right bank of the Weser, approx. 20 km north of Nienburg, and 15 km southwest of Verden.

Hoya is also the seat of the Samtgemeinde ("collective municipality") Grafschaft Hoya. Hoya was the center of the medieval and early modern County of Hoya.
