= Warpe, Lower Saxony =

- Municipality
- Coat of arms

- Location of Warpe, Lower Saxony within Nienburg/Weser district
- Interactive map of Warpe, Lower Saxony
- Location within Germany Location within Lower Saxony
- Coordinates: 52°44′N 9°6′E
- Country: Germany
- State: Lower Saxony
- District: Nienburg/Weser
- Municipal assoc.: Grafschaft Hoya
- Subdivisions: 4

Government
  - Mayor: Hermann Heuermann

Area
  - Total: 20 km^{2} (7.7 sq mi)
- Elevation: 32 m (105 ft)

Population (2025-12-31)
  - Total: 671
  - Density: 34/km^{2} (87/sq mi)
- Time zone: UTC+01:00 (CET)
  - Summer (DST): UTC+02:00 (CEST)
- Postal codes: 27333
- Dialling codes: 05022
- Vehicle registration: NI
- Website: www.hoya-weser.de

Warpe is a municipality in the district of Nienburg, in Lower Saxony, Germany.
