= Heemsen (Samtgemeinde) =

- Samtgemeinde
- Location of Heemsen within Nienburg district
- Interactive map of Heemsen
- Location within Germany Location within Lower Saxony
- Coordinates: 52°42′N 9°16′E
- Country: Germany
- State: Lower Saxony
- District: Nienburg
- Seat: Rohrsen
- Subdivisions: 4 municipalities

Area
  - Total: 74.49 km^{2} (28.76 sq mi)

Population (2025-12-31)
  - Total: 6,422
  - Density: 86.21/km^{2} (223.3/sq mi)
- Time zone: UTC+01:00 (CET)
  - Summer (DST): UTC+02:00 (CEST)
- Website: www.heemsen.de

Heemsen is a Samtgemeinde ("collective municipality") in the district of Nienburg, in Lower Saxony, Germany. Its seat is in the village Rohrsen.

The Samtgemeinde Heemsen consists of the following municipalities:

1. Drakenburg
2. Haßbergen
3. Heemsen
4. Rohrsen
