= Lemke (Marklohe) =

Coordinates: 52.6600°N 9.1486°E

Lemke is a hamlet which was formerly a municipality in the district of Nienburg, in Lower Saxony, Germany. It is approximately 5 km northwest of Nienburg, and 30 km south of Verden, around the conjunction of Wohlenhauser Strasse and Sulinger Strasse, at roughly latitude 52.667 and longitude 9.150.

In 1974, it was incorporated into Marklohe. The arms of Lemke were: Vert, a trefoil slipped and in base a barrulet wavy or; they were granted on September 8, 1967.
