= Uchte (Samtgemeinde) =

- Samtgemeinde
- Location of Uchte within Nienburg district
- Interactive map of Uchte
- Location within Germany Location within Lower Saxony
- Coordinates: 52°30′N 8°55′E
- Country: Germany
- State: Lower Saxony
- District: Nienburg
- Seat: Uchte
- Subdivisions: 4 municipalities

Area
  - Total: 284.29 km^{2} (109.76 sq mi)

Population (2025-12-31)
  - Total: 13,461
  - Density: 47.350/km^{2} (122.63/sq mi)
- Time zone: UTC+01:00 (CET)
  - Summer (DST): UTC+02:00 (CEST)
- Website: www.uchte.de

Uchte is a Samtgemeinde ("collective municipality") in the district of Nienburg, in Lower Saxony, Germany. Its seat is in the village Uchte.

The Samtgemeinde Uchte consists of the following municipalities:

1. Diepenau
2. Raddestorf
3. Uchte
4. Warmsen
