= William Wrede =

German Lutheran theologian (1859–1906)

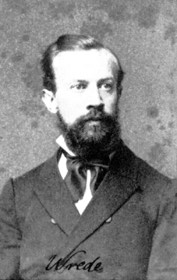
- Born: 10 May 1859; Bücken. Kingdom of Hanover
- Died: 23 November 1906 (aged 47); Breslau, German Empire
- Known for: History of religions school

Georg Friedrich Eduard William Wrede (German: [ˈvʀeːdə]; 10 May 1859 – 23 November 1906) was a German Lutheran theologian.

== Biography ==
Wrede was born at Bücken in the Kingdom of Hanover. He became an associate professor at Breslau in 1893, and full professor in 1896. He died in office in 1906.

He became famous for his investigation of the Messianic Secret theme in the Gospel of Mark. He suggested that this was a literary and apologetic device by which early Christians could explain away the absence of any clear claim to be the Messiah. According to Wrede, the solution devised by the author of the Mark Gospel was to imply that Jesus kept his messiahship secret to his inner group of supporters. He also wrote a crucial study of the Second Epistle to the Thessalonians, which argued for its inauthenticity.

In his work on Paul, Paulus, he argued that without Paul, Christianity would have basically become just another backwater Jewish sect that would have had little influence in later religious development. As a result, he concluded that Paul was "the second founder of Christianity." He went so far as to separate Paul from his Jewish background, arguing that Paul was definitely influenced by certain Hellenistic concepts. As a result, his understanding of the flesh/spirit dualism within Paul parallels that of many others who understand flesh from a Hellenistic context where matter itself is inherently corrupted.

His work and that of Albert Schweitzer mark the end of the First Quest or Old Quest into the historical Jesus. Schweitzer's 1906 book was called The Quest of the Historical Jesus: A Critical Study of Its Progress from Reimarus to Wrede. (See the Quest for the historical Jesus.)

== Works (selection) ==
- Ueber Aufgabe und Methode der sogenannten Neutestamentlichen Theologie, Göttingen 1897. (Published in English as "The Task and Methods of New Testament Theology", in Studies in Biblical Theology, 1973.)
- Das Messiasgeheimnis in den Evangelien, Göttingen 1901. (Published in English as The Messianic Secret, London 1971)
- Paulus, Halle 1904 / Tübingen 1907 (Published in English as Paul, London 1907)
- Die Echtheit des zweiten Thessalonicherbriefes untersucht (The Authenticity of the Second Letter to the Thessalonians investigated), Leipzig 1903.

== Sources ==
- Robert Morgan, The Nature of New Testament Theology: The Contribution of William Wrede and Adolf Schlatter, Minneapolis: Wipf & Stock 2009.
