= Bücken =

- Municipality
- Coat of arms

- Location of Bücken within Nienburg/Weser district
- Interactive map of Bücken
- Location within Germany Location within Lower Saxony
- Coordinates: 52°46′N 9°8′E
- Country: Germany
- State: Lower Saxony
- District: Nienburg/Weser
- Municipal assoc.: Grafschaft Hoya
- Subdivisions: 5

Government
  - Mayor: Wilhelm Schröder

Area
  - Total: 32.5 km^{2} (12.5 sq mi)
- Elevation: 18 m (59 ft)

Population (2025-12-31)
  - Total: 2,119
  - Density: 65.2/km^{2} (169/sq mi)
- Time zone: UTC+01:00 (CET)
  - Summer (DST): UTC+02:00 (CEST)
- Postal codes: 27333
- Dialling codes: 04251
- Vehicle registration: NI
- Website: www.hoya-weser.de

Bücken (German pronunciation: [ˈbʏkn̩]) is a municipality in the district of Nienburg, in Lower Saxony, Germany.

== Quarters ==
- Altenbücken
- Bücken
- Calle
- Dedendorf
- Duddenhausen

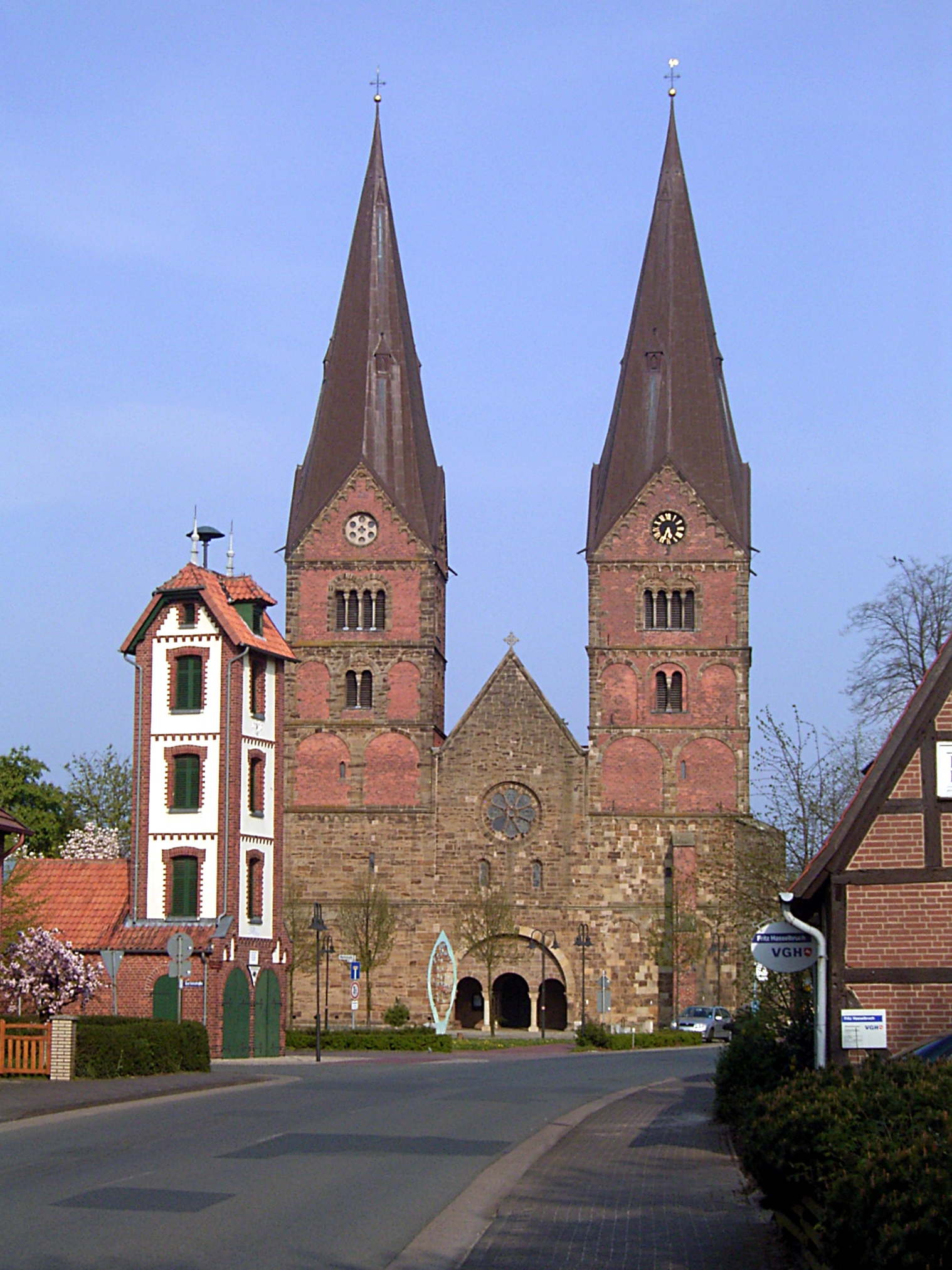
Bücken church

== History ==
An Abbey was established here in Bücken in the year 882 by Rimbert, Archbishop of Bremen. On Bücken’s market place stands a monument which serves as a reminder of the unusual legend surrounding its origin: a donkey is said to have indicated the site where the church was to be built.

About 1050, the original wooden structure was replaced by a relatively small stone edifice which was expanded in several stages of construction until the year 1350. With the dissolution of the Abbey and its property after the reformation, the church fell partly to ruin and remained so until its full restoration through Adelbert Hotzen in the years 1863–1867. Since 1413 Bücken has been a market town.

== Notable people ==
- Georg Dietrich Leyding, 1664–1710, German composer and organist
- Carl Koldewey, 1837–1908, German Arctic explorer
- William Wrede, 1859-1906, German Lutheran theologian
