= Weser-Aue =

- Samtgemeinde
- Location of Weser-Aue within Nienburg district
- Interactive map of Weser-Aue
- Location within Germany Location within Lower Saxony
- Coordinates: 52°38′N 9°08′E
- Country: Germany
- State: Lower Saxony
- District: Nienburg
- Seat: Marklohe
- Subdivisions: 6 municipalities

Area
  - Total: 177.92 km^{2} (68.70 sq mi)

Population (2025-12-31)
  - Total: 13,980
  - Density: 78.57/km^{2} (203.5/sq mi)
- Time zone: UTC+01:00 (CET)
  - Summer (DST): UTC+02:00 (CEST)
- Website: www.weser-aue.de

Weser-Aue is a Samtgemeinde ("collective municipality") in the district of Nienburg, in Lower Saxony, Germany. Its seat is in the village Marklohe. It was established on 1 November 2021 by the merger of the former Samtgemeinden Marklohe and Liebenau.

The Samtgemeinde Weser-Aue consists of the following municipalities:

1. Balge
2. Binnen
3. Liebenau
4. Marklohe
5. Pennigsehl
6. Wietzen
