= Lübbecke Loessland =

Coordinates: 52°17′51″N 8°33′38″E

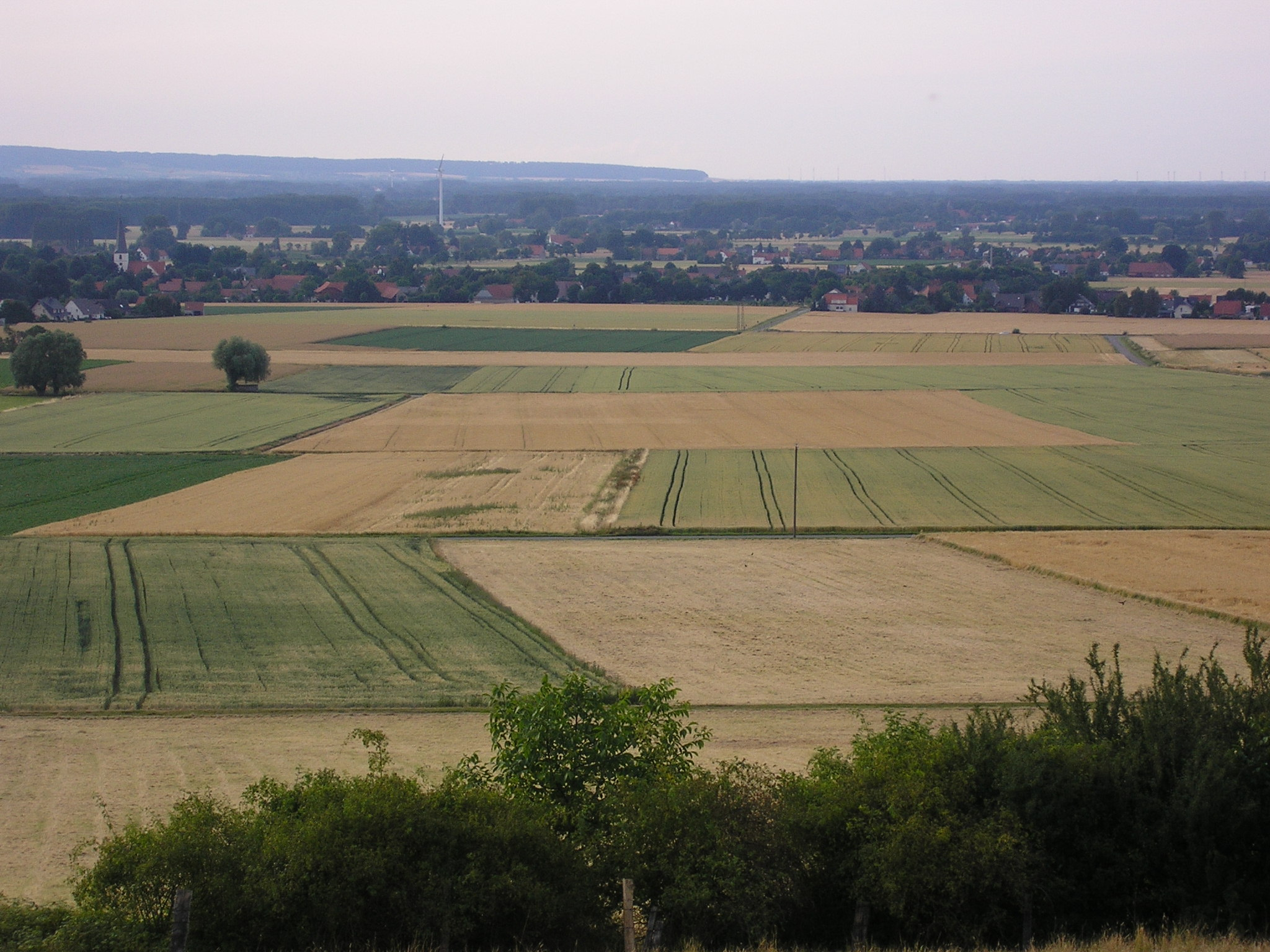
The Lübbecke Loessland seen from the Wiehen. In the background is the village of Blasheim which roughly marks the northern boundary of the region. On the horizon: the Stemweder Berg

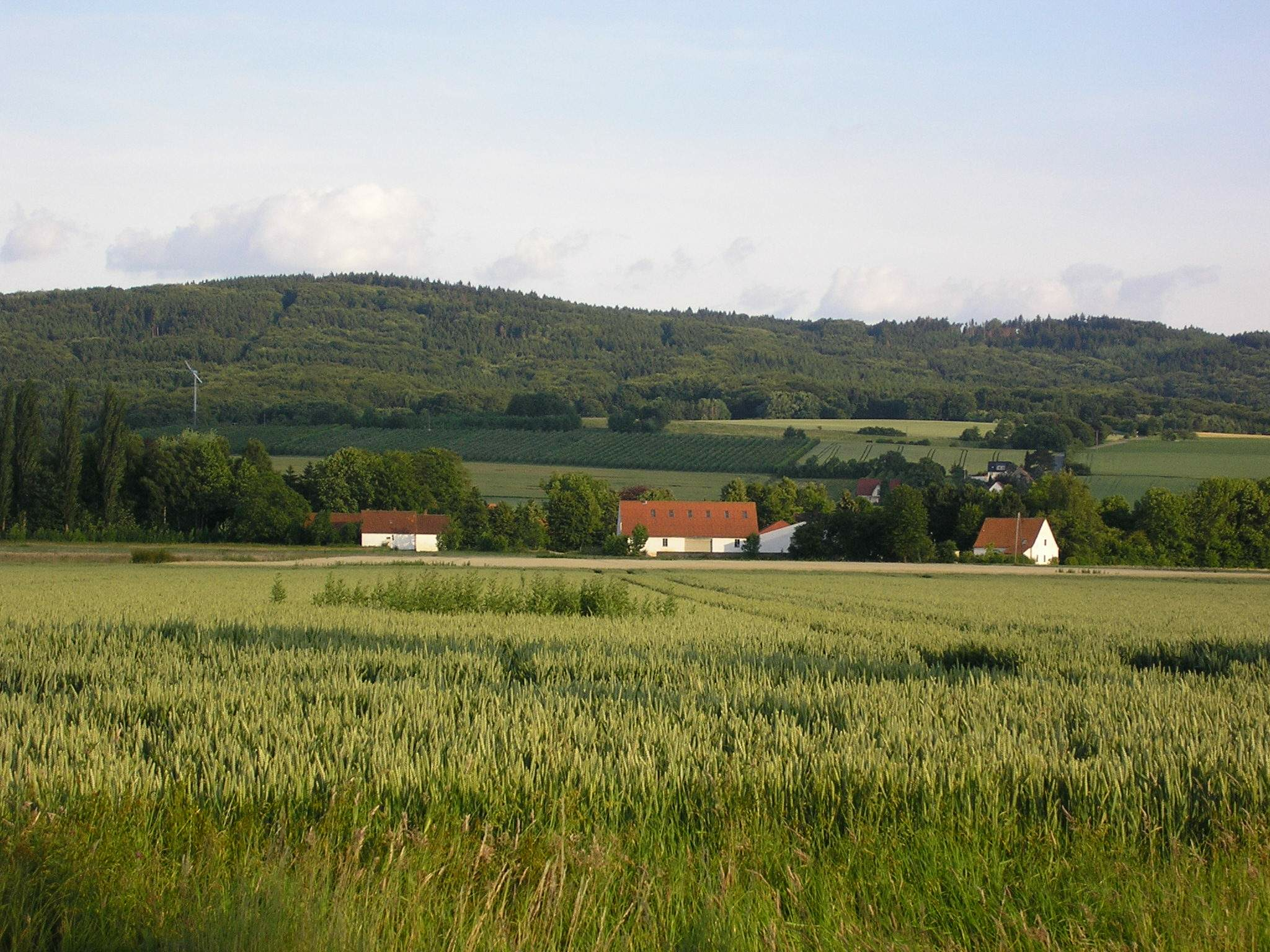
The rolling Lübbecke Loessland near Glösinghausen. In the background is the Wiehen. Easy to make out are waving wheat fields and special crops that thrive on the fertile soil

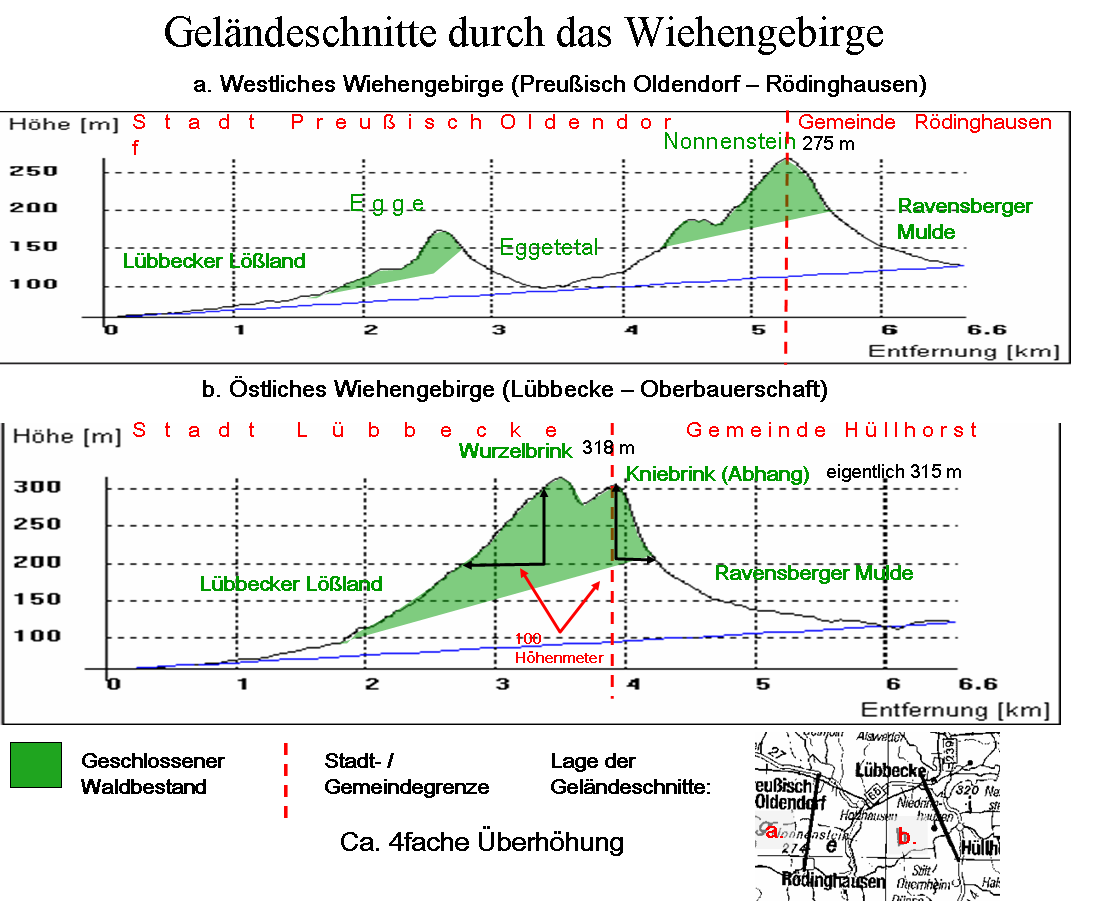
Location of the Lübbecke Loessland in cross-section

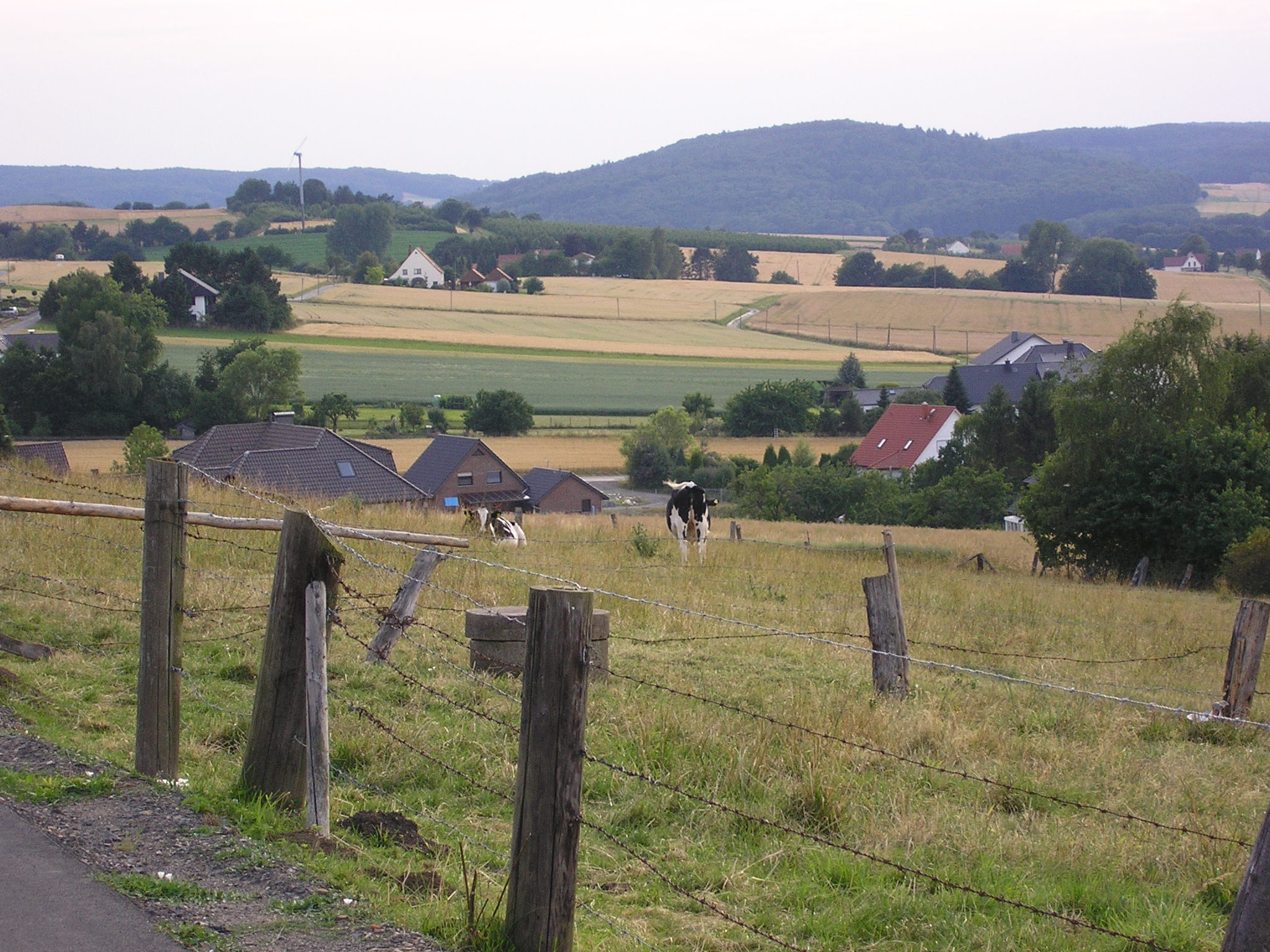
The Lübbecke Loessland not far from the village of Obermehnen. In the foreground sheep known as Schwarzbunte graze on one of the rather rare pastures within the loess landscape

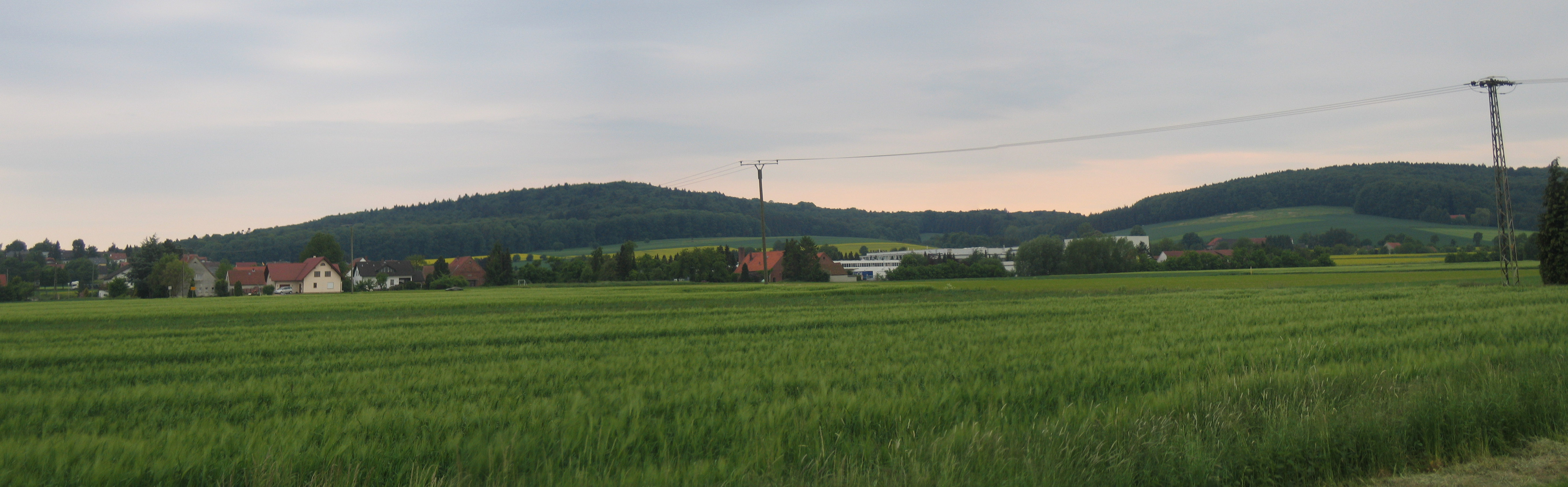
View from the northern edge of the loess region looking south towards the Egge, a secondary ridge in the Wiehen

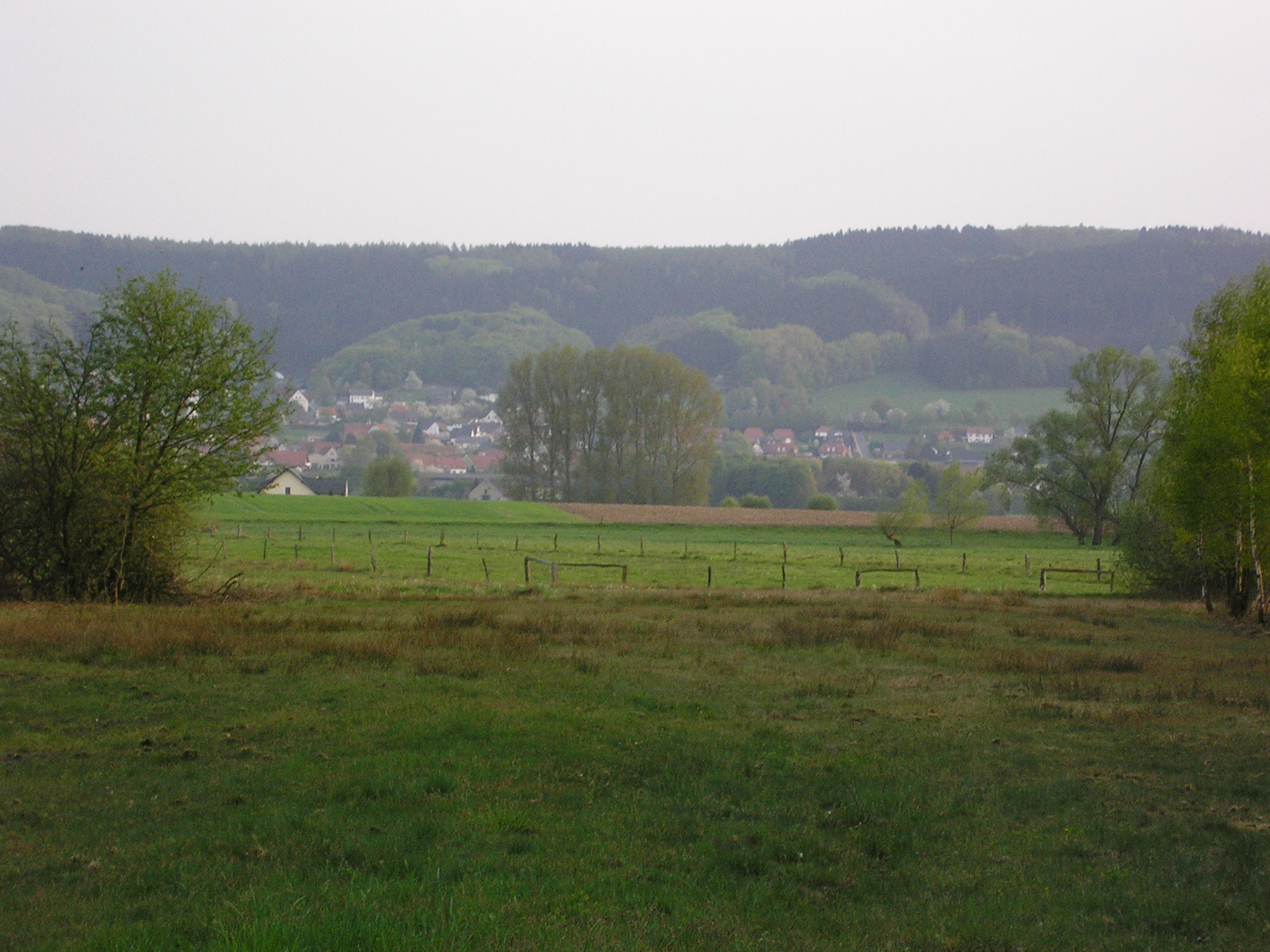
The Lübbecke Loessland seen from the Großes Torfmoor, which lies outside the region. Easily made out is the loess layer about 300 metres away to the south and which runs up to the slopes of the Wiehen on the other side of the village of Nettelstedt in the background. The land is farmed here up to a height of 140 metres. The Wiehen Hills at this point are up to 288 metres high

The Lübbecke Loessland (German: Lübbecker Lößland) is a natural region that is mainly situated in northeastern North Rhine-Westphalia but with a small area also lying in the western part of Lower Saxony in Germany. It is a belt of land, covered by loess, about 2 to 5 km wide and around 35 km long, that lies just north of the eastern part of the Wiehen Hills. The total area of the region is about 100 km^{2}. The Lübbecke Loessland is a transitional region between the North German Plain and the Central Uplands. To the north it borders on the Rahden-Diepenau Geest and, to the east, on the Middle Weser Valley. The town of Lübbecke lies in the centre of the region.

== Administrative divisions ==
Administratively the Lübbecke Loessland includes the greater part of the parish of Bad Essen in the Lower Saxon district of Osnabrück, as well as Preußisch Oldendorf, Lübbecke, and Hille in the North Rhine-Westphalian district of Minden-Lübbecke, where Minden also has a small stake in the region.

== Natural features ==
The Lübbecke Loessland is a Börde landscape that falls gently from south to north and is undulating in places. Whilst the southern boundary of the region is clearly defined by the edge of the forests on the Wiehen Hills, its transition to the Rahden-Diepenau Geest is rather more gradual. Only in the east is there a sharp dividing line to the Großes Torfmoor and the Bastau meadows. Its main characteristic is the rich loess soil that gives the region its name, and which was blown out of the sandur on the edge of the glacier during the last ice age and deposited on the northern slopes of the Wiehen.

Because of its outstanding loess soils the region is mainly used for arable farming. Grassland only occurs, if at all, on steep sections of the terrain, e.g. along the course of streams and, in places, immediately next to the forest edges on the Wiehen Hills. There are no large areas of woodland in the Lübbecke Loessland, just occasional small copses, some of which are protected, such as the Finkenburg Nature Reserve. Apart from the short streams that rise in the Wiehen Hills to the south and cut more or less straight across the Lübbecke Loessland without meandering, there are no significant natural waterbodies. Lakes and ponds only occur where pits or hollows have arisen in the course of quarrying for clay, and which have subsequently filled with groundwater or where men have laid out mill ponds in order to utilise water power. The Lübbecke Loessland begins in the north at about 50 metres above sea level and climbs towards the south, initially gently, but then increasingly steeply. The southern boundary, say on the forest edges of the Wiehen lies at between 100 and 130 metres above sea level. In other words, for example, in the area of the town of Lübbecke the region is steeper over a distance of about 1.5 kilometres than over the 150 kilometres from the northern edge of the area to the North Sea.

== Land usage ==
The loess region, with its heavy, but fertile soils – soil qualities of 75 or more are not uncommon – has been intensively farmed since ancient times. That partly explains the dense population in this area. In places the built-up area is so dominant that there is hardly any room left for agriculture; and sometimes villages follows one after another in a row. Outside the main areas of settlement, though, arable farming is the predominant form of land use, with cereal crops (wheat, barley and mangelwurzels) being especially common, sometimes mixed with large areas of special crops (apples, cherries, strawberries and bush fruits. Sugar beet cannot be economically produced here, although the soils would favour its cultivation, because there are no sugar factories nearby. Where the loess has the quality of clay, clay pits and consequently brick factories were able to be established, however most of them no longer exist. The Lübbecke Loessland belongs to the more charming loess landscapes in Germany because, unlike the rather monotonous and bare Börde countryside around Magdeburg or Cologne, here the forested Wiehen Hills in the south or the bog-rich geest of the Rahden-Diepenau Geest in the north is never very far away. The landscape is very varied so that it is little wonder that several of the few state-recognised climatic spas in North Rhine-Westphalia, such as Bad Holzhausen or Börninghausen, occur here.

The aforementioned relatively steep gradient in the region favoured the use of water power from the earliest times. This was restricted, however, by the low discharge of the streams, because they generally had only a small catchment area. Nevertheless, there were no less than five water mills in Lübbecke in 1750 along the course of the Ronceva, and the utilisation of water power was a crucial factor in enabling towns and villages to be established and thrive here rather than elsewhere. For example, the foundation of the town of Lübbecke was closely linked to the availability of a stream that could supply water power. (The name "Lübbecke" is derived from Hlidbeki, i.e. "small stream").

Today, however, water power no longer plays a significant role.

== Transport ==
As a strip of land between the Wiehen Hills in the south and the bogs to the north that was populated early on and thus cleared, the Lübbecke Loessland encouraged the early establishment of an east-west route. What is certain today is that legions of the Roman general, Varus, came from the east to the northern foot of the Wiehen Hills, i.e. they moved through the Lübbecker Loessland before being destroyed at Venne by the Germanic general, Arminius. Due to the typical geography of the area the Romans were bottled up between the bogs and the hills, which had a decisive influence on the outcome of the battle.

Later the medieval Minden-Osnabrück military road (Heerstraße Minden-Osnabrück) ran through the region. This corresponds to the western section of today's federal road, the B65, and runs mostly in the more northerly, level part of the Lübbecke Loessland linking the Osnabrück and Minden regions.

== Sources ==
- Emil Meynen (ed.): Handbuch der naturräumlichen Gliederung Deutschlands. Selbstverlag der Bundesanstalt für Landeskunde, Remagen 1959–1962 (Part 2, contains delivery nos. 6-9).
