= Hilgermissen =

- Municipality
- Coat of arms

- Location of Hilgermissen within Nienburg/Weser district
- Interactive map of Hilgermissen
- Location within Germany Location within Lower Saxony
- Coordinates: 52°50′46″N 9°9′5″E
- Country: Germany
- State: Lower Saxony
- District: Nienburg/Weser
- Municipal assoc.: Grafschaft Hoya
- Subdivisions: 8

Government
  - Mayor: Johann Hustedt

Area
  - Total: 54.43 km^{2} (21.02 sq mi)
- Elevation: 16 m (52 ft)

Population (2025-12-31)
  - Total: 2,018
  - Density: 37.08/km^{2} (96.02/sq mi)
- Time zone: UTC+01:00 (CET)
  - Summer (DST): UTC+02:00 (CEST)
- Postal codes: 27318
- Dialling codes: 04256, 04251, 04255
- Vehicle registration: NI
- Website: www.hoya-weser.de

Hilgermissen is a municipality in the district of Nienburg, in Lower Saxony, Germany.

It is distinguished by the fact that local streets are not named. Instead addresses are given as a house number plus the village name and postal code. In a local referendum in February 2019, 60 percent of voters rejected a proposal to introduce street names.
