= Eystrup =

- Municipality
- Location of Eystrup within Nienburg (Weser) district
- Interactive map of Eystrup
- Location within Germany Location within Lower Saxony
- Coordinates: 52°47′N 9°13′E
- Country: Germany
- State: Lower Saxony
- District: Nienburg (Weser)
- Municipal assoc.: Grafschaft Hoya

Government
  - Mayor: Wilhelm Bergmann-Kramer (CDU)

Area
  - Total: 24.05 km^{2} (9.29 sq mi)
- Elevation: 15 m (49 ft)

Population (2025-12-31)
  - Total: 3,621
  - Density: 150.6/km^{2} (390.0/sq mi)
- Time zone: UTC+01:00 (CET)
  - Summer (DST): UTC+02:00 (CEST)
- Postal codes: 27324
- Dialling codes: 04254
- Vehicle registration: NI
- Website: www.eystrup.de

Eystrup is a municipality in the district of Nienburg, in Lower Saxony, Germany. It is situated on the right bank of the Weser, approx. 15 km north of Nienburg, and 15 km south of Verden. Eystrup was the seat of the former Samtgemeinde ("collective municipality") Eystrup.
