= Haßbergen =

- Municipality
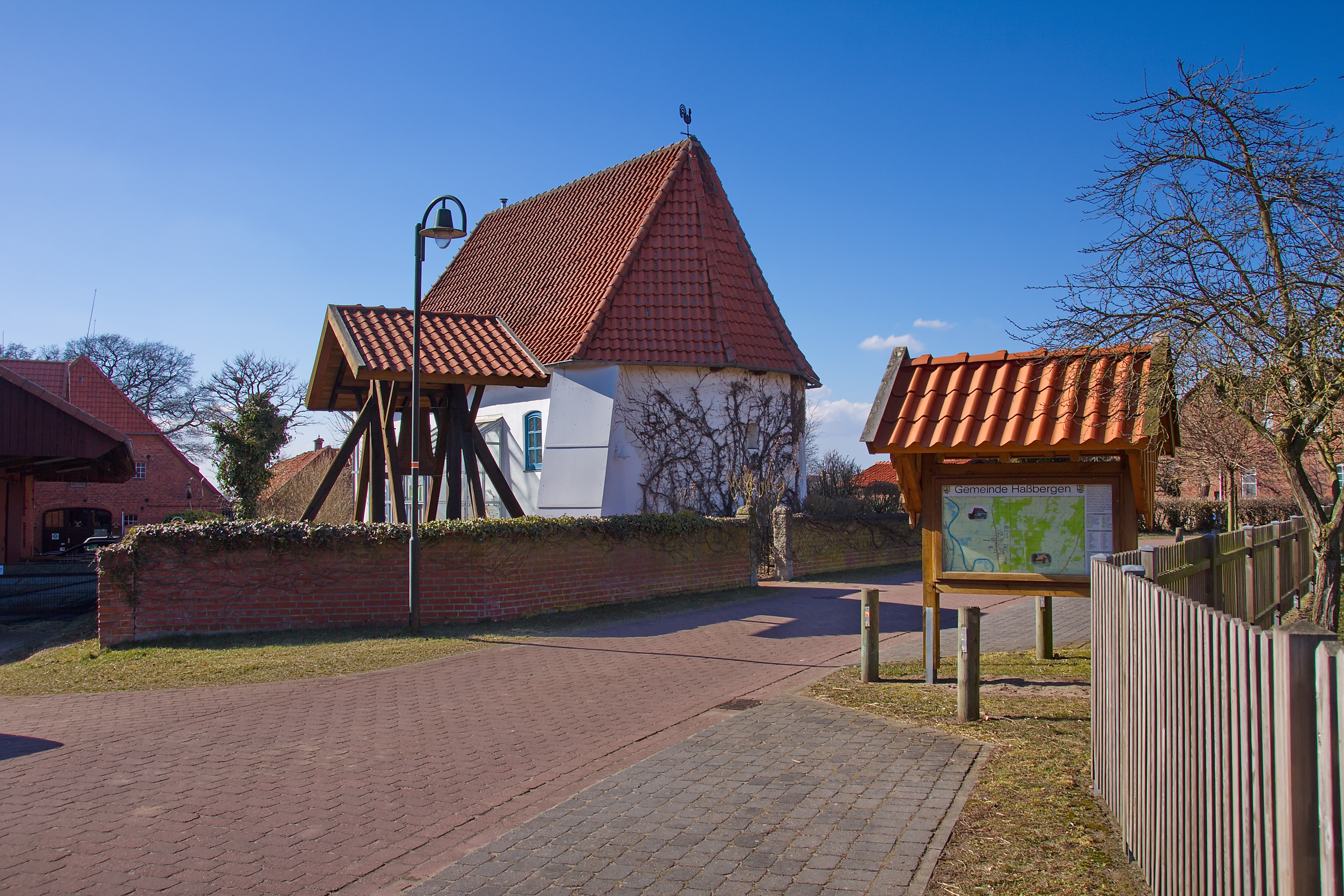
- Chapel in Haßbergen

- Coat of arms

- Location of Haßbergen within Nienburg/Weser district
- Interactive map of Haßbergen
- Location within Germany Location within Lower Saxony
- Coordinates: 52°44′N 09°14′E
- Country: Germany
- State: Lower Saxony
- District: Nienburg/Weser
- Municipal assoc.: Heemsen

Government
  - Mayor: Burkhard Schmädeke (CDU)

Area
  - Total: 17.6 km^{2} (6.8 sq mi)
- Elevation: 24 m (79 ft)

Population (2025-12-31)
  - Total: 1,679
  - Density: 95.4/km^{2} (247/sq mi)
- Time zone: UTC+01:00 (CET)
  - Summer (DST): UTC+02:00 (CEST)
- Postal codes: 31626
- Dialling codes: 05024
- Vehicle registration: NI

Haßbergen is a municipality in the district of Nienburg, in Lower Saxony, Germany.
