= Grafschaft Hoya (Samtgemeinde) =

- Samtgemeinde
- Location of Grafschaft Hoya within Nienburg district
- Interactive map of Grafschaft Hoya
- Location within Germany Location within Lower Saxony
- Coordinates: 52°48′N 9°08′E
- Country: Germany
- State: Lower Saxony
- District: Nienburg
- Seat: Hoya
- Subdivisions: 10 municipalities

Area
  - Total: 215.55 km^{2} (83.22 sq mi)

Population (2025-12-31)
  - Total: 16,909
  - Density: 78.446/km^{2} (203.17/sq mi)
- Time zone: UTC+01:00 (CET)
  - Summer (DST): UTC+02:00 (CEST)
- Website: www.grafschaft-hoya.de

Grafschaft Hoya is a Samtgemeinde ("collective municipality") in the district of Nienburg, in Lower Saxony, Germany. Its seat is in the town Hoya. In 1979 it took its current name, in reference to the medieval County of Hoya. On 1 January 2011, it merged with the former Samtgemeinde Eystrup.

The Samtgemeinde Grafschaft Hoya consists of the following municipalities:

1. Bücken
2. Eystrup
3. Gandesbergen
4. Hämelhausen
5. Hassel
6. Hilgermissen
7. Hoya
8. Hoyerhagen
9. Schweringen
10. Warpe
