= Schweringen =

- Municipality
- Coat of arms

- Location of Schweringen within Nienburg/Weser district
- Interactive map of Schweringen
- Location within Germany Location within Lower Saxony
- Coordinates: 52°44′N 9°11′E
- Country: Germany
- State: Lower Saxony
- District: Nienburg/Weser
- Municipal assoc.: Grafschaft Hoya
- Subdivisions: 3

Government
  - Mayor: Hermann Kastens (CDU)

Area
  - Total: 19.53 km^{2} (7.54 sq mi)
- Elevation: 20 m (66 ft)

Population (2025-12-31)
  - Total: 849
  - Density: 43.5/km^{2} (113/sq mi)
- Time zone: UTC+01:00 (CET)
  - Summer (DST): UTC+02:00 (CEST)
- Postal codes: 27333
- Dialling codes: 04257
- Vehicle registration: NI
- Website: www.hoya-weser.de

Schweringen (German pronunciation: [ˈʃveːʁɪŋən]) is a municipality in the district of Nienburg, in Lower Saxony, Germany.
