= Hoyerhagen =

- Municipality
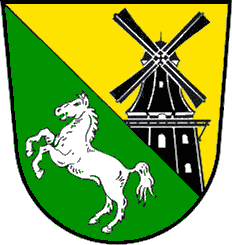
- Coat of arms

- Location of Hoyerhagen within Nienburg/Weser district
- Interactive map of Hoyerhagen
- Location within Germany Location within Lower Saxony
- Coordinates: 52°49′N 9°5′E
- Country: Germany
- State: Lower Saxony
- District: Nienburg/Weser
- Municipal assoc.: Grafschaft Hoya

Government
  - Mayor: Karsten Borstelmann

Area
  - Total: 23 km^{2} (8.9 sq mi)
- Elevation: 15 m (49 ft)

Population (2025-12-31)
  - Total: 946
  - Density: 41/km^{2} (110/sq mi)
- Time zone: UTC+01:00 (CET)
  - Summer (DST): UTC+02:00 (CEST)
- Postal codes: 27318
- Dialling codes: 04251
- Vehicle registration: NI
- Website: www.hoya-weser.de

Hoyerhagen is a municipality in the district of Nienburg, in Lower Saxony, Germany.
