= Pennigsehl =

- Municipality
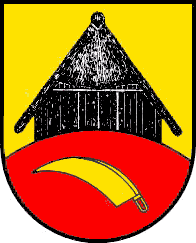
- Coat of arms

- Location of Pennigsehl within Nienburg/Weser district
- Interactive map of Pennigsehl
- Location within Germany Location within Lower Saxony
- Coordinates: 52°38′N 09°01′E
- Country: Germany
- State: Lower Saxony
- District: Nienburg/Weser
- Municipal assoc.: Weser-Aue
- Subdivisions: 2

Government
  - Mayor: Sabine Siedenberg-Arndt (SPD)

Area
  - Total: 24.21 km^{2} (9.35 sq mi)
- Elevation: 48 m (157 ft)

Population (2025-12-31)
  - Total: 1,181
  - Density: 48.78/km^{2} (126.3/sq mi)
- Time zone: UTC+01:00 (CET)
  - Summer (DST): UTC+02:00 (CEST)
- Postal codes: 31621
- Dialling codes: 05028
- Vehicle registration: NI

Pennigsehl is a municipality in the district of Nienburg, in Lower Saxony, Germany.
