= Wietzen =

- Municipality
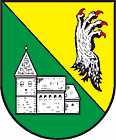
- Coat of arms

- Location of Wietzen within Nienburg/Weser district
- Interactive map of Wietzen
- Location within Germany Location within Lower Saxony
- Coordinates: 52°43′N 09°04′E
- Country: Germany
- State: Lower Saxony
- District: Nienburg/Weser
- Municipal assoc.: Weser-Aue

Government
  - Mayor: Friedrich Sieling (CDU)

Area
  - Total: 40.41 km^{2} (15.60 sq mi)
- Elevation: 45 m (148 ft)

Population (2025-12-31)
  - Total: 1,939
  - Density: 47.98/km^{2} (124.3/sq mi)
- Time zone: UTC+01:00 (CET)
  - Summer (DST): UTC+02:00 (CEST)
- Postal codes: 31613
- Dialling codes: 05022
- Vehicle registration: NI
- Website: www.marklohe.de

Wietzen is a municipality in the district of Nienburg, in Lower Saxony, Germany.
