= Warmsen =

- Municipality
- Coat of arms

- Location of Warmsen within Nienburg/Weser district
- Interactive map of Warmsen
- Location within Germany Location within Lower Saxony
- Coordinates: 52°27′17″N 08°51′03″E
- Country: Germany
- State: Lower Saxony
- District: Nienburg/Weser
- Municipal assoc.: Uchte
- Subdivisions: 6

Government
  - Mayor: Karsten Heineking (CDU)

Area
  - Total: 81.61 km^{2} (31.51 sq mi)
- Elevation: 46 m (151 ft)

Population (2025-12-31)
  - Total: 3,105
  - Density: 38.05/km^{2} (98.54/sq mi)
- Time zone: UTC+01:00 (CET)
  - Summer (DST): UTC+02:00 (CEST)
- Postal codes: 31606
- Dialling codes: 05767
- Vehicle registration: NI
- Website: www.warmsen.de

Warmsen is a municipality in the district of Nienburg, in Lower Saxony, Germany.
