= Raddestorf =

- Municipality
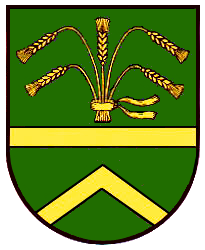
- Coat of arms

- Location of Raddestorf within Nienburg/Weser district
- Interactive map of Raddestorf
- Location within Germany Location within Lower Saxony
- Coordinates: 52°27′N 08°58′E
- Country: Germany
- State: Lower Saxony
- District: Nienburg/Weser
- Municipal assoc.: Uchte
- Subdivisions: 7

Government
  - Mayor: Heinrich Stellhorn (CDU)

Area
  - Total: 33.07 km^{2} (12.77 sq mi)
- Elevation: 34 m (112 ft)

Population (2025-12-31)
  - Total: 1,806
  - Density: 54.61/km^{2} (141.4/sq mi)
- Time zone: UTC+01:00 (CET)
  - Summer (DST): UTC+02:00 (CEST)
- Postal codes: 31604
- Dialling codes: 05765
- Vehicle registration: NI

Raddestorf is a municipality in the district of Nienburg, in Lower Saxony, Germany. The municipality consists of the twelve small villages: Dierstorf, Glissen, Gräsebilde, Halle, Harrienstedt, Huddestorf, Jenhorst, Kalteschale, Kleinenheerse, Kreuzkrug, Raddestorf and Westenfeld. The City of Minden is 25 km away, the distance to the state capital Hanover is 64 km.
