= Hämelhausen =

- Municipality
- Location of Hämelhausen within Nienburg/Weser district
- Interactive map of Hämelhausen
- Location within Germany Location within Lower Saxony
- Coordinates: 52°47′N 09°17′E
- Country: Germany
- State: Lower Saxony
- District: Nienburg/Weser
- Municipal assoc.: Grafschaft Hoya

Government
  - Mayor: Johann Meyer

Area
  - Total: 9.07 km^{2} (3.50 sq mi)
- Elevation: 19 m (62 ft)

Population (2025-12-31)
  - Total: 562
  - Density: 62.0/km^{2} (160/sq mi)
- Time zone: UTC+01:00 (CET)
  - Summer (DST): UTC+02:00 (CEST)
- Postal codes: 27324
- Dialling codes: 04254
- Vehicle registration: NI

Hämelhausen is a municipality in the district of Nienburg, in Lower Saxony, Germany. It belongs to the collective municipality (Samtgemeinde) of Grafschaft Hoya. Hämelhausen sits in the Hämel Heath, south of which is the Hämelsee

== Geography ==
Hämelhausen sits between the Wildeshausen Geest and the Steinhuder Meer Nature Park, roughly halfway between Bremen and Hannover.

== Other names ==
Previous names for the location are To dem Hemelhus in 1300, Hemelszhusz in 1380, Hemmihuss, and Hemelheide in 1508.

"Hamal" and the root "Ham-" means "angle" or "angular," thus roughly "angular terrain along rivers or bights."
