= Balge =

- Municipality
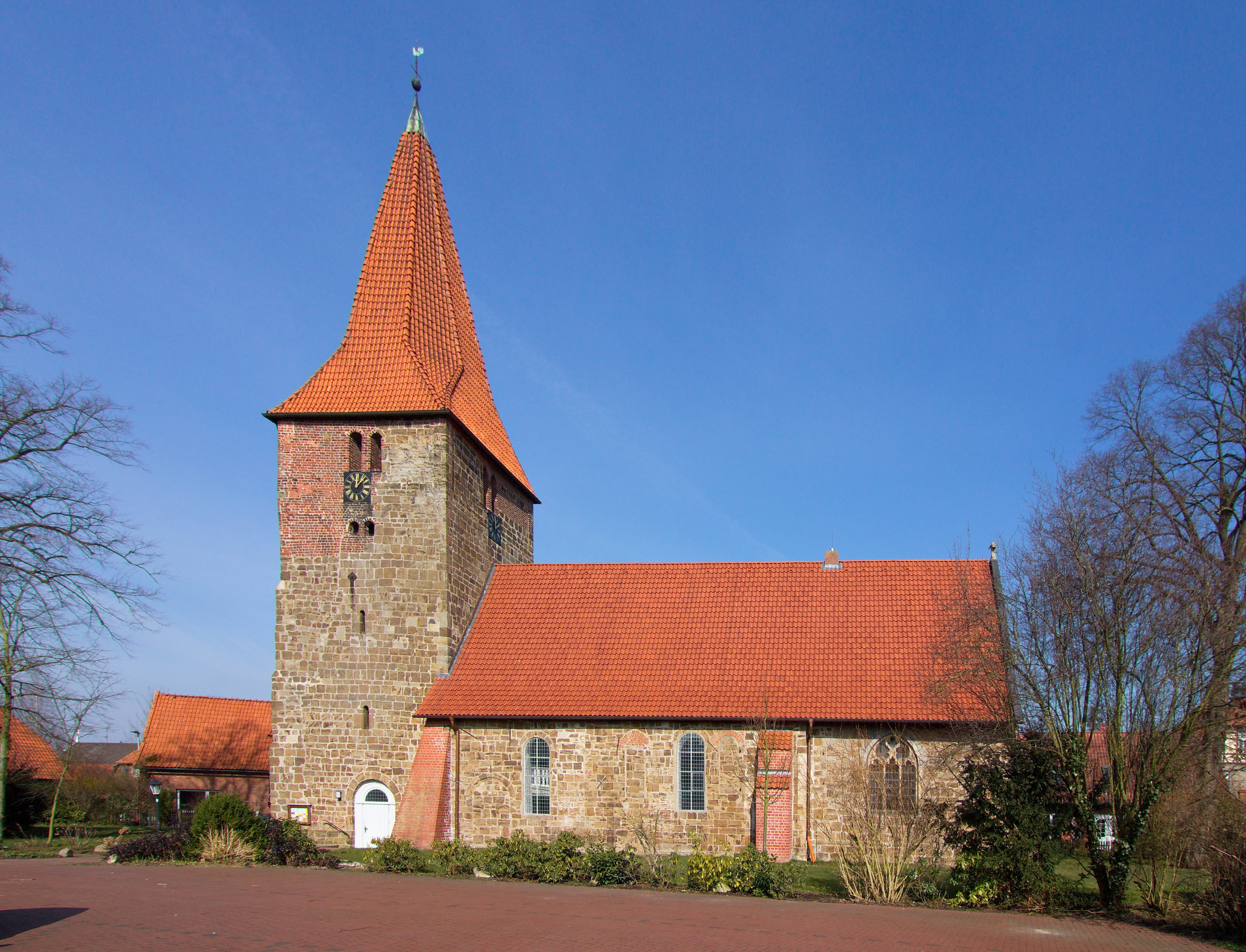
- Church in Balge

- Coat of arms

- Location of Balge within Nienburg/Weser district
- Interactive map of Balge
- Location within Germany Location within Lower Saxony
- Coordinates: 52°43′10″N 09°11′11″E
- Country: Germany
- State: Lower Saxony
- District: Nienburg/Weser
- Municipal assoc.: Weser-Aue
- Subdivisions: 10

Government
  - Mayor: Barbara König-Meyer (SPD)

Area
  - Total: 33.07 km^{2} (12.77 sq mi)
- Elevation: 23 m (75 ft)

Population (2025-12-31)
  - Total: 1,621
  - Density: 49.02/km^{2} (127.0/sq mi)
- Time zone: UTC+01:00 (CET)
  - Summer (DST): UTC+02:00 (CEST)
- Postal codes: 31609
- Dialling codes: 04257, 05021 oder 05022
- Vehicle registration: NI

Balge is a municipality in the district of Nienburg, in Lower Saxony, Germany, located on the Weser river. The community belongs to the Samtgemeinde Weser-Aue which consists of six municipalities including Balge.

== History ==
On March 1, 1974 the community of Balge, Blenhorst, Bötenberg, Buchhorst, Holzbalge, Mehlbergen and Sebbenhausen were merged to form a new municipality called Blenhorst. The name was officially changed to Balge on January 23, 1976.

== Politics ==
The local council of governance consists of eleven women counsellors. Including:

- 6 SPD seats
- 5 seats for members at large from the Balge voting community (as of the election of September 11, 2011).

Barbara King-Meyer (SPD) is honorary mayor from the community of Balge

== Sites ==
- In Blenhorst there is a sawmill and flour mill that has been in operation since 1769.
- In Bötenberg there is a watermill, the Benther Mill, that was first registered as a grain mill in 1553. It is no longer in operation, but was a grain mill and sawmill.
- The village church in Balge with its striking tower was built circa 1300 in Romanesque style.
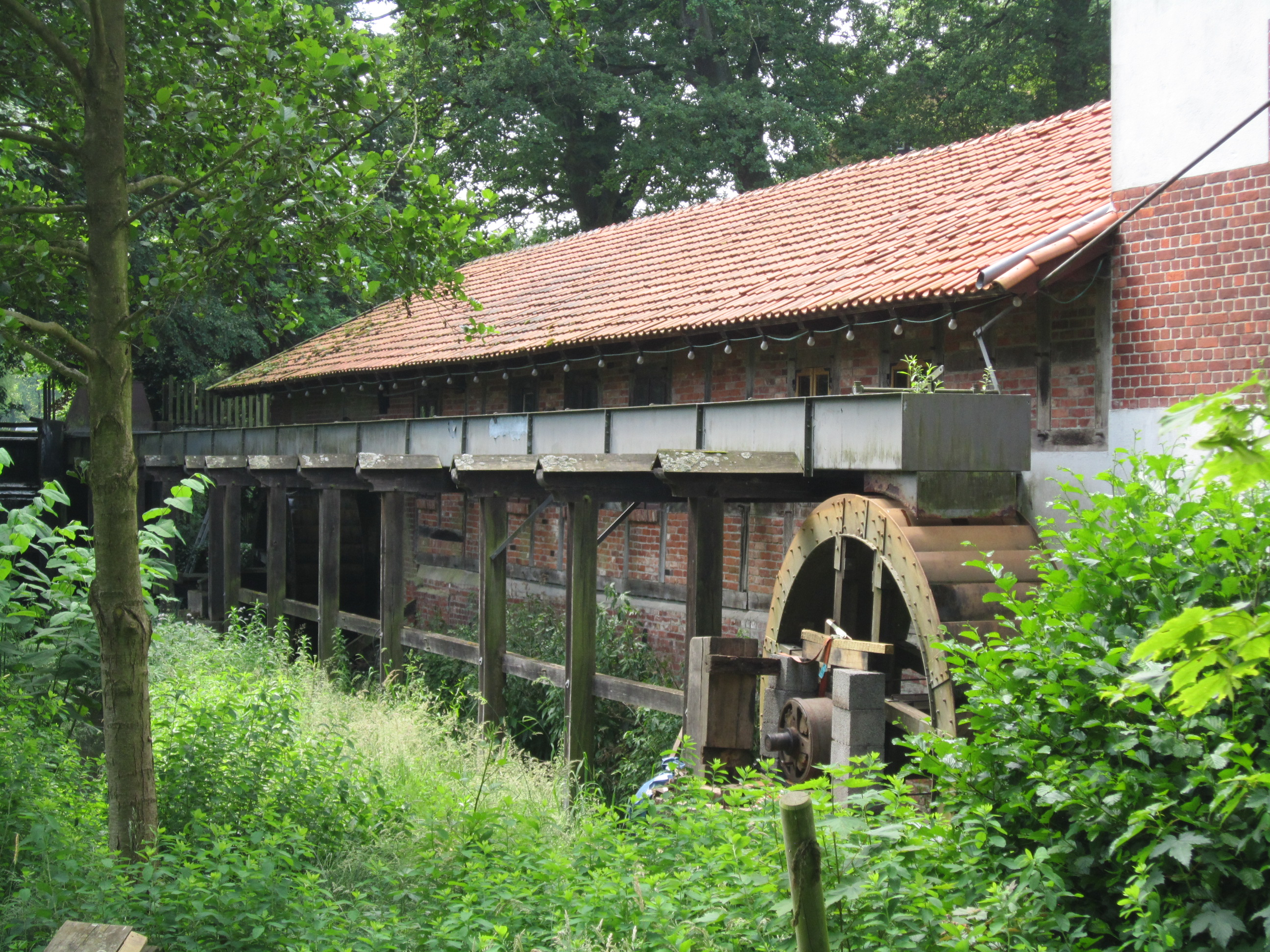
Watermill in Blenhorst

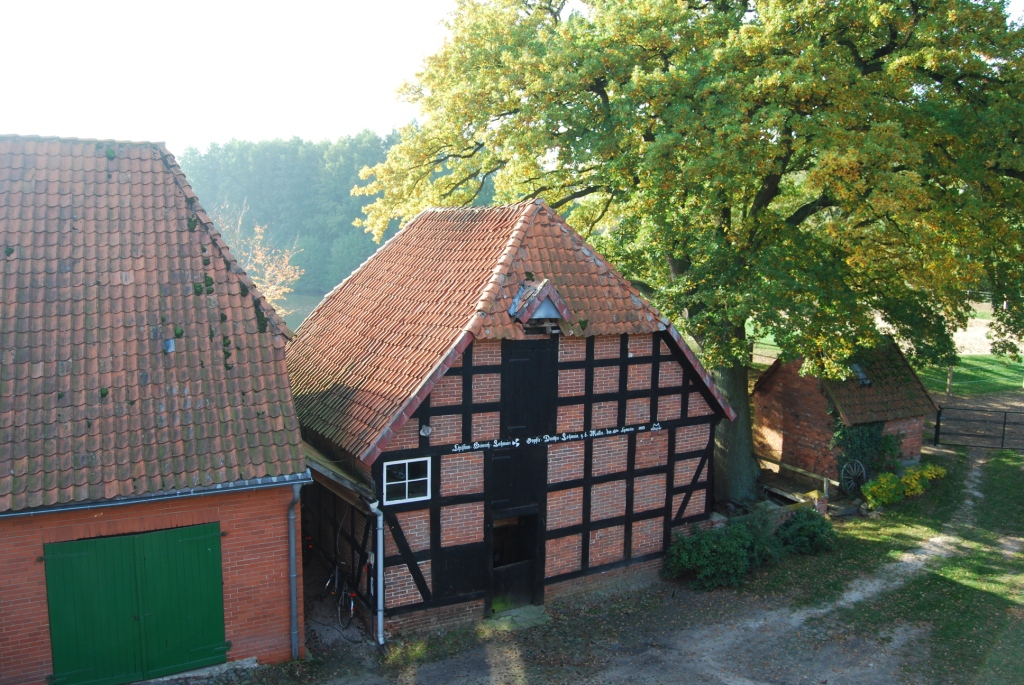
Benther mill / Bötenberg

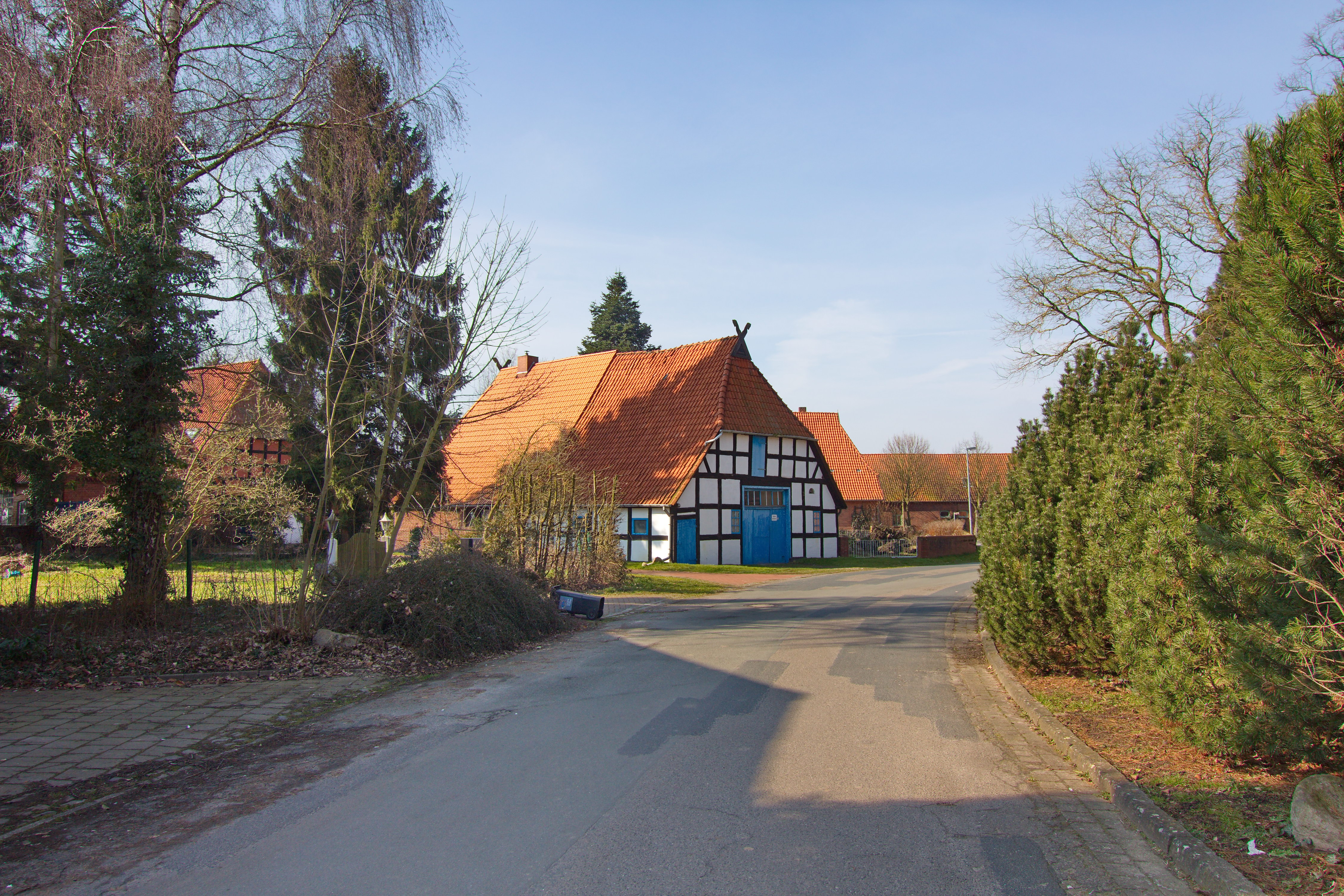
Balge view

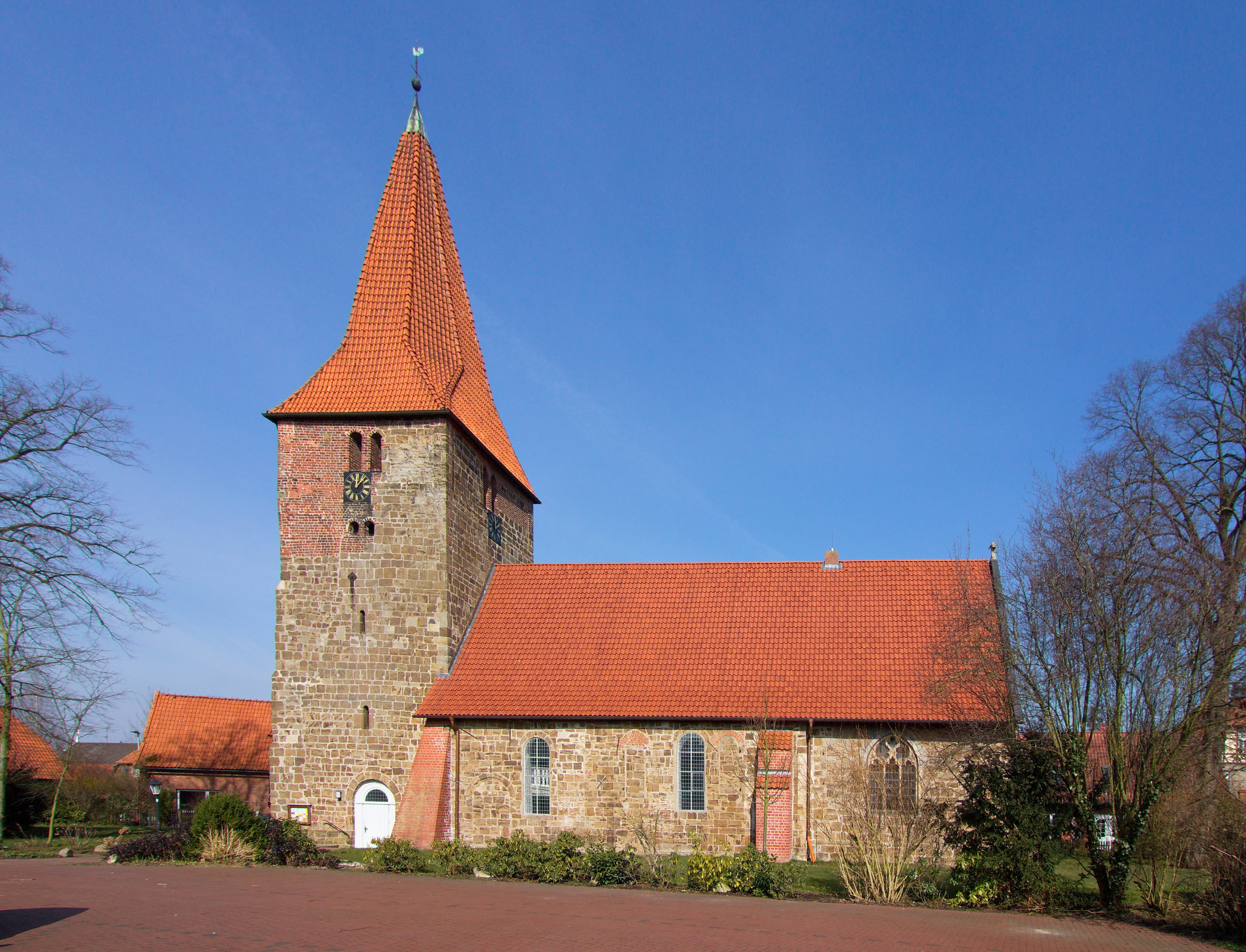
St. Bartholomäus church

== Sports ==
The sports club in Balge (SV Sebbenhausen / Balge), sponsors several gun clubs, and two marching bands from individual districts.

== Education ==
- Kindergarten in Balge
- Because of strong evidence of projected decrease in school population, (sometimes only five students per year) the closure of the primary school site in Balge was decided in early 2008.

== Noteworthy Person ==
Heinrich Löhmann - (1933 Siebbenhausen). Farmer and author of "Kindheit Auf dem Dorf, Jungend in wechselvoller Zeit"
