= Marklohe =

- Municipality
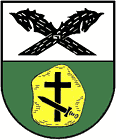
- Coat of arms

- Location of Marklohe within Nienburg/Weser district
- Interactive map of Marklohe
- Location within Germany Location within Lower Saxony
- Coordinates: 52°40′N 09°10′E
- Country: Germany
- State: Lower Saxony
- District: Nienburg/Weser
- Municipal assoc.: Weser-Aue

Government
  - Mayor: Horst Reschke (CDU)

Area
  - Total: 32.94 km^{2} (12.72 sq mi)
- Elevation: 25 m (82 ft)

Population (2025-12-31)
  - Total: 4,531
  - Density: 137.6/km^{2} (356.3/sq mi)
- Time zone: UTC+01:00 (CET)
  - Summer (DST): UTC+02:00 (CEST)
- Postal codes: 31608
- Dialling codes: 05021
- Vehicle registration: NI
- Website: www.marklohe.de

Marklohe is a municipality in Lower Saxony, Germany.

== Geography ==
=== Geographical location ===
The municipality of Marklohe is located 5 km from Nienburg on the opposite side of the river Weser and midway between Verden (Aller) and Minden. Marklohe is the administrative seat of the Samtgemeinde Weser-Aue.

=== Municipality structure ===
The municipality of Marklohe belongs to a district that directly adjoins the district of Lemke and Wohlenhausen, and is about 1,5 km from the district of Ortsteil Oyle.

== History ==
In 1931 the town changed from its original name, Lohe, to Marklohe. The speculation was that the central gathering place, Marklohe, was called Marklo by the pre-Christian Saxons. That idea could not be certified.

== Politics ==
=== Municipal government ===
The municipal government of Marklohe consists of 15 council men and council women.

- CDU 6 Seats
- SPD 6 Seats
- The Greens 2 Seats
- FWG 1 Seat

(As of municipal elections on 11 September 2011)

=== Mayor ===
In the current local election period (2011-2016), Günther Ballandat (SPD) serves as the honorary mayor of the municipality.

== Culture and items of interest ==
There is an open-air theater in Marklohe. It is the home of the Amateur Players Association of Marklohe, and is operated by volunteers. Each summer they present Low German dialect play.

The association is also active in the winter months. Here, in the France Guest House in Marklohe the horn works of Nienburg (Weser) are played.

== Buildings ==
The church of St. Clement of Rome was built in the 12th century and has wall paintings and carvings in the choir.

== Economy and infrastructure ==
The community is located just off the route 214. The route runs from Nienburg/Weser to Sulingen, and Bundesstraße 6 from Nienburg/Wesser to Bremen.

== Climate ==
Climate in this area has mild differences between highs and lows, and there is adequate rainfall year-round. The Köppen Climate Classification subtype for this climate is "Cfb". (Marine West Coast Climate/Oceanic climate).

== Personalities ==
- Hans Adolf von Arenstorff (1895–1952), Major-General and landowner
- Magdalene Thimme (1880–1951), German educator and opponent to National Socialism
- William Thimme (1879–1966), German theologian and professor
