= Binnen =

- Municipality
- Coat of arms

- Location of Binnen within Nienburg/Weser district
- Interactive map of Binnen
- Location within Germany Location within Lower Saxony
- Coordinates: 52°37′N 09°08′E
- Country: Germany
- State: Lower Saxony
- District: Nienburg/Weser
- Municipal assoc.: Weser-Aue
- Subdivisions: 3 Ortsteile

Government
  - Mayor: Heinrich Schomburg (CDU)

Area
  - Total: 24.78 km^{2} (9.57 sq mi)
- Elevation: 24 m (79 ft)

Population (2025-12-31)
  - Total: 949
  - Density: 38.3/km^{2} (99.2/sq mi)
- Time zone: UTC+01:00 (CET)
  - Summer (DST): UTC+02:00 (CEST)
- Postal codes: 31619
- Dialling codes: 05023
- Vehicle registration: NI

Binnen (German pronunciation: [ˈbɪnən]) is a municipality in the district of Nienburg, in Lower Saxony, Germany.
