= Gandesbergen =

- Municipality
- Coat of arms

- Location of Gandesbergen within Nienburg/Weser district
- Interactive map of Gandesbergen
- Location within Germany Location within Lower Saxony
- Coordinates: 52°46′N 09°14′E
- Country: Germany
- State: Lower Saxony
- District: Nienburg/Weser
- Municipal assoc.: Grafschaft Hoya

Government
  - Mayor: Karl-Heinz Stein

Area
  - Total: 6.99 km^{2} (2.70 sq mi)
- Elevation: 21 m (69 ft)

Population (2025-12-31)
  - Total: 522
  - Density: 74.7/km^{2} (193/sq mi)
- Time zone: UTC+01:00 (CET)
  - Summer (DST): UTC+02:00 (CEST)
- Postal codes: 27324
- Dialling codes: 04254
- Vehicle registration: NI

Gandesbergen is a municipality in the district of Nienburg, in Lower Saxony, Germany.
