= Rohrsen =

- Municipality
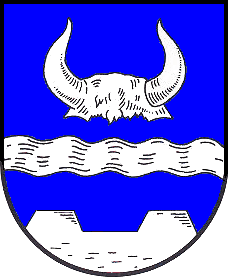
- Coat of arms

- Location of Rohrsen within Nienburg/Weser district
- Interactive map of Rohrsen
- Location within Germany Location within Lower Saxony
- Coordinates: 52°42′36″N 9°13′56″E
- Country: Germany
- State: Lower Saxony
- District: Nienburg/Weser
- Municipal assoc.: Heemsen

Government
  - Mayor: Fritz Bormann (CDU)

Area
  - Total: 5.09 km^{2} (1.97 sq mi)
- Elevation: 24 m (79 ft)

Population (2025-12-31)
  - Total: 1,134
  - Density: 223/km^{2} (577/sq mi)
- Time zone: UTC+01:00 (CET)
  - Summer (DST): UTC+02:00 (CEST)
- Postal codes: 31627
- Dialling codes: 05024
- Vehicle registration: NI

Rohrsen is a municipality in the district of Nienburg, in Lower Saxony, Germany.
