= Diepenau =

- Municipality
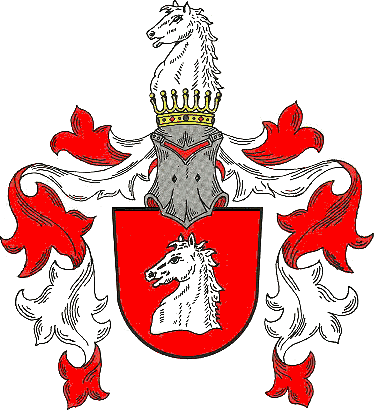
- Coat of arms

- Location of Diepenau within Nienburg/Weser district
- Interactive map of Diepenau
- Location within Germany Location within Lower Saxony
- Coordinates: 52°25′22″N 8°44′00″E
- Country: Germany
- State: Lower Saxony
- District: Nienburg/Weser
- Municipal assoc.: Uchte
- Subdivisions: 5

Government
  - Mayor: Annegret Trampe (CDU)

Area
  - Total: 70.05 km^{2} (27.05 sq mi)
- Elevation: 44 m (144 ft)

Population (2025-12-31)
  - Total: 3,829
  - Density: 54.66/km^{2} (141.6/sq mi)
- Time zone: UTC+01:00 (CET)
  - Summer (DST): UTC+02:00 (CEST)
- Postal codes: 31603
- Dialling codes: 05775 und 05777
- Vehicle registration: NI
- Website: www.diepenau.de

Diepenau is a municipality in the district of Nienburg, in Lower Saxony, Germany.
