= Heemsen =

- Municipality
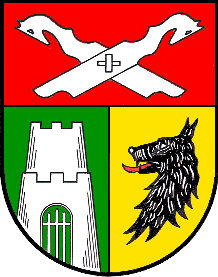
- Coat of arms

- Location of Heemsen within Nienburg/Weser district
- Interactive map of Heemsen
- Location within Germany Location within Lower Saxony
- Coordinates: 52°43′N 09°16′E
- Country: Germany
- State: Lower Saxony
- District: Nienburg/Weser
- Municipal assoc.: Heemsen
- Subdivisions: 4

Government
  - Mayor: Heinrich Heidorn (CDU)

Area
  - Total: 39.37 km^{2} (15.20 sq mi)
- Elevation: 23 m (75 ft)

Population (2025-12-31)
  - Total: 1,815
  - Density: 46.10/km^{2} (119.4/sq mi)
- Time zone: UTC+01:00 (CET)
  - Summer (DST): UTC+02:00 (CEST)
- Postal codes: 31622
- Dialling codes: 05024
- Vehicle registration: NI

Heemsen is a municipality in the district of Nienburg, in Lower Saxony, Germany. It is situated approximately 8 km northeast of Nienburg, and 25 km south of Verden. The joint municipality of Heemsen encompasses an area of approximately 74,000 square meters.

Heemsen is part of the Samtgemeinde ("collective municipality") Heemsen.
