= Hassel (Weser) =

- Municipality
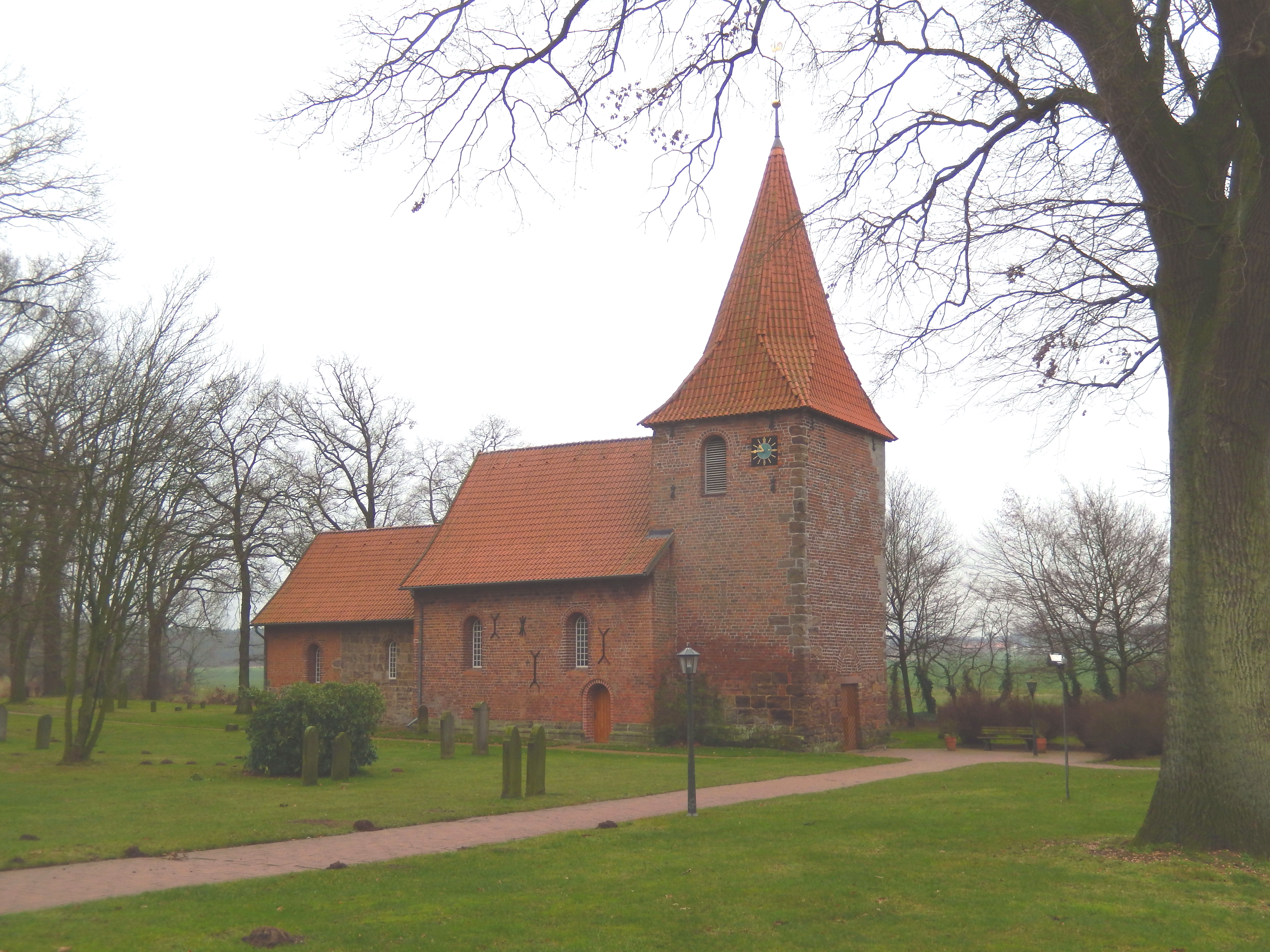
- Church in Hassel

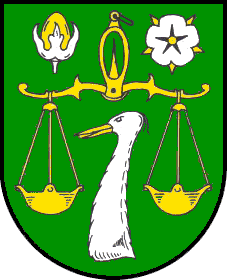
- Coat of arms

- Location of Hassel within Nienburg/Weser district
- Interactive map of Hassel
- Location within Germany Location within Lower Saxony
- Coordinates: 52°48′N 09°12′E
- Country: Germany
- State: Lower Saxony
- District: Nienburg/Weser
- Municipal assoc.: Grafschaft Hoya

Government
  - Mayor: Heiko Lange

Area
  - Total: 17.67 km^{2} (6.82 sq mi)
- Elevation: 21 m (69 ft)

Population (2025-12-31)
  - Total: 1,764
  - Density: 99.83/km^{2} (258.6/sq mi)
- Time zone: UTC+01:00 (CET)
  - Summer (DST): UTC+02:00 (CEST)
- Postal codes: 27324
- Dialling codes: 04254
- Vehicle registration: NI

Hassel (Weser) (German pronunciation: [ˈhasl̩]) is a municipality in the district of Nienburg, in Lower Saxony, Germany.
