= Drakenburg =

- Municipality
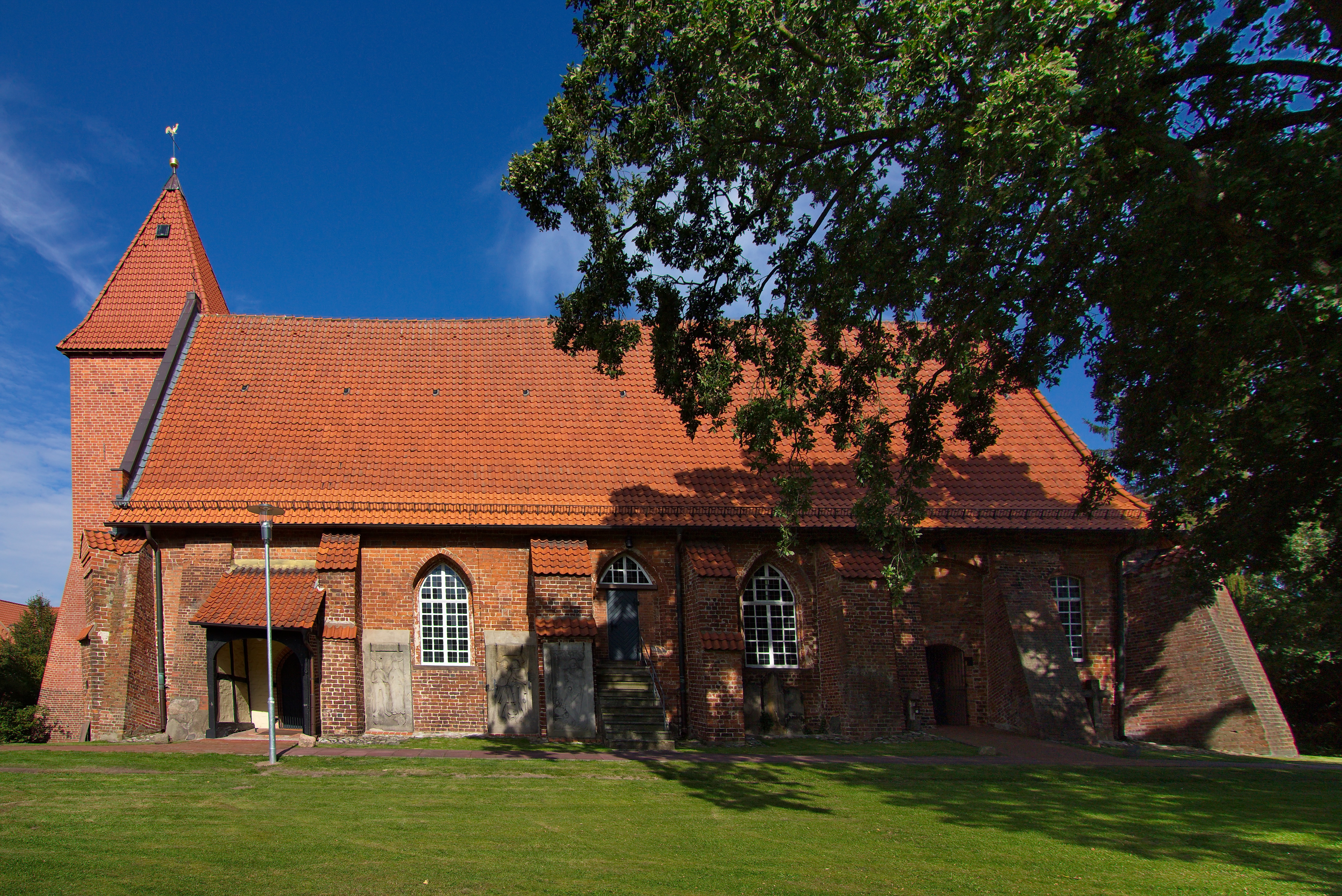
- Church in Drakenburg

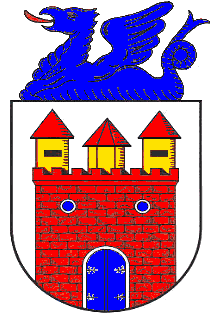
- Coat of arms

- Location of Drakenburg within Nienburg/Weser district
- Interactive map of Drakenburg
- Location within Germany Location within Lower Saxony
- Coordinates: 52°41′N 09°12′E
- Country: Germany
- State: Lower Saxony
- District: Nienburg/Weser
- Municipal assoc.: Heemsen

Government
  - Mayor: Klaus Timke (SPD)

Area
  - Total: 11.76 km^{2} (4.54 sq mi)
- Elevation: 24 m (79 ft)

Population (2025-12-31)
  - Total: 1,794
  - Density: 152.6/km^{2} (395.1/sq mi)
- Time zone: UTC+01:00 (CET)
  - Summer (DST): UTC+02:00 (CEST)
- Postal codes: 31623
- Dialling codes: 05024
- Vehicle registration: NI
- Website: www.drakenburg.de

Drakenburg is a municipality in the district of Nienburg, in Lower Saxony, Germany.
