= Nienburg (district) =

District in Lower Saxony, Germany

Coordinates: 52°40′N 9°10′E

- District
- Flag Coat of arms
- Country: Germany
- State: Lower Saxony
- Capital: Nienburg

Government
  - District admin.: Detlev Kohlmeier

Area
  - Total: 1,399 km^{2} (540 sq mi)

Population (31 December 2022)
  - Total: 123,469
  - Density: 88/km^{2} (230/sq mi)
- Time zone: UTC+01:00 (CET)
  - Summer (DST): UTC+02:00 (CEST)
- Vehicle registration: NI
- Website: landkreis-nienburgweser.de

Nienburg (German: [ˈniːn.ˌbʊʁk]) is a district (Landkreis) in Lower Saxony, Germany. It is bounded by (from the west and clockwise) the districts of Diepholz, Verden, Heidekreis, Hanover and Schaumburg, and by the state of North Rhine-Westphalia (district of Minden-Lübbecke).

== History ==
From the early Middle Ages to the end of the 16th century this region was the heart of the County of Hoya. The ruling family became extinct in 1582, and the central and southern parts of the county were annexed by the Lüneburg branch of the duchy of Brunswick-Lüneburg. In 1705 the area of Nienburg and Hoya became subordinate to Hanover.

In 1866 the Kingdom of Hanover was annexed by Prussia. The Prussian government established the districts of Nienburg and Stolzenau, which were merged in 1932.

The earliest official mention of Nienburg/Weser dates from the year 1025, when Milo, the Canon of Minden, apparently made a gift of his property in Nienburg to the Minden church. Since this early mention spoke of Nienburg (= new castle), some kind sort of fortress must already have existed there for some time, perhaps in order to protect the crossing of the Weser. Under the protection of this fortress the initially insecure settlement became permanent, and was first officially referred to a "civitas" (a town) in 1215.

The castle and the town of Nienburg were the seat of the Counts of Hoya, from whom the citizenry and guilds managed to extract many privileges. When the line of the Counts of Hoya died out in 1582, their property became the line of the Guelphic Dukes of Braunschweig-Lüneburg. Nienburg then remained under the Guelphs until 1866, with a short interruption from 1803 to 1813, when it was annexed by the French. Today only the "Stockturm" remains as a visible reminder of the many centuries of the Middle-Ages history of the town, when the fortress town of Nienburg stood guard over the main Weser crossing between Minden and Bremen. The sarcophagus of the last Count of Hoya, Otto VII, and his wife Agnes von Bentheim, and that of the most important Count in the history of the town, Jobst II (died 1545) and his wife Anna von Gleichen, are both to be found in the "Turmhalle-Martinskirche". The emblem of the war - like Counts of Hoya - a black bear-paw - still appears today in certificates and documents, and has also been taken over in the arms and seal of the town. The blue lion in the arms of the town refers to the Princes of Guelph who first ruled over the area through the Dukes of Braunschweig-Lüneburg, and then the Electors and later Kings of Hannover until the Kingdom of the Guelphs became a province of Prussia in 1866. The 16th century was the time of the Reformation, which was concluded in the year 1581 by the decree of the Hoya Church. During the 30 Years' War the town was besieged and destroyed. In 1625 the town was successfully defended by the "Reformed' forces against the army of General Tilly. From those times the legend of the "Wähligen Rott" derives, a band of defenders who sortied from the town and took a banner and other great booty from Tilly's besieging forces a tent. The banner and the tents are still displayed today at the annual "Scheibenschießen" (shooting tournament), a local festival with a tradition of over 600 years. By the end of the 30 Years War, two-thirds of the town were in ruins. Years of rapid reconstruction now took place; during the Seven Years' War, however, the town again suffered substantial damage, when the French army occupied it in 1757. At the beginning of the 19th century the town of Nienburg had to look after the accommodation of Napoleonic troops, sometimes up to 18,000 men all at once. At that time, an important event for the future development of the town took place: the demolition of the Middle-Ages fortifications. The years of peace after 1815 comprised a period of growth, during which the town could then expand rapidly. The overcoming of the destructions of the Second World War allowed Nienburg to enjoy a dramatic upturn in its fortunes. With its population of around 33,000 people, the town of Nienburg/Weser is today the economic and cultural centre of the otherwise empty area between the two major conurbations of Hannover and Bremen.

== Geography ==
The district is roughly located between Bremen and Hanover. The Weser River enters the district in the south, coming from North Rhine-Westphalia, and runs north towards Bremen.

== Coat of arms ==
The coat of arms displays:

- two horses on piles, a typical decoration of farms in the region
- a bear's paw, symbolising the County of Hoya
- a horn from the arms of the County of Wölpe

== Towns and municipalities ==
Clickable map of towns and municipalities in the district

Towns	Samtgemeinden
1. Nienburg; 2. Rehburg-Loccum; Free municipalities: 1. Steyerberg	1. Grafschaft Hoya; 1. Bücken; 2. Eystrup; 3. Gandesbergen; 4. Hämelhausen; 5. Hassel; 6. Hilgermissen; 7. Hoya^{1, 2}; 8. Hoyerhagen; 9. Schweringen; 10. Warpe; 2. Heemsen; 1. Drakenburg; 2. Haßbergen; 3. Heemsen; 4. Rohrsen^{1}	3. Mittelweser; 1. Estorf; 2. Husum; 3. Landesbergen; 4. Leese; 5. Stolzenau^{1}; 4. Steimbke; 1. Linsburg; 2. Rodewald; 3. Steimbke^{1}; 4. Stöckse	5. Uchte; 1. Diepenau; 2. Raddestorf; 3. Uchte^{1}; 4. Warmsen; 6. Weser-Aue; 1. Balge; 2. Binnen; 3. Liebenau; 4. Marklohe^{1}; 5. Pennigsehl; 6. Wietzen
	^{1}seat of the Samtgemeinde; ^{2}town

== See also ==
- Metropolitan region Hannover-Braunschweig-Göttingen-Wolfsburg
