= Souzan Barakat =

German Yazidi murder victim (1998–2011)

- Born: 1 January 1998; Iraq
- Died: 5 December 2011 (aged 13); Stolzenau, Lower Saxony, Germany
- Cause of death: Gunshot
- Resting place: Hanover-Lahe city cemetery, Hanover
- Known for: Victim of an alleged honor killing
- Parent: Ali Askar Hasso Barakat (father)

Souzan Barakat (1 January 1998 – 5 December 2011) was a 13-year-old Yazidi girl who was shot dead by her father Ali Askar Hasso Barakat on the street in Stolzenau, Lower Saxony, Germany.

Her murder was described as an honor killing in some media and by some investigators and caused horror beyond the borders of Germany.

== Life ==
Souzan Barakat was a Yazidi girl who came to Germany with her family from Iraq in 2001. She attended the 5th grade of a secondary school in Nienburg, where the family had lived since 2008. She had three younger brothers and is said to have been living in the Überflieger youth facility (which was looked after by the Nienburg youth welfare office) in Asendorf in the Diepholz district, for four months before the crime.

== Murder ==
=== Course of the murder ===
During the time that she was being cared for by the youth welfare office, her father Ali Askar Hasso Barakat (alias: Sallah Ali Mischko) is said to have tried to have her admitted to psychiatry with a report that a fellow countryman had prepared for him. On 5 December 2011, a conversation between Souzan and her parents was to take place in the youth welfare office in Stolzenau. On that day her father Ali Askar Hasso Barakat is said to have killed her with six shots in front of the youth welfare office on the street. Souzan's mother was present at the crime. It is disputed whether the act was a so-called honor killing. The father (35 years old at the time of the crime) then fled in his car. The getaway car was discovered in Minden on December 7, 2011. After the crime, the mother and her three sons also went into hiding. In October 2012, the murder weapon (a pistol) was discovered in the getaway car after the getaway car was sold by the public prosecutor in Verden. The new owner of the getaway car had found the murder weapon under a cover in the front footwell while cleaning the vehicle. On December 14, 2011, Souzan Barakat's body was buried in the Hanover-Lahe city cemetery. There is a burial ground there especially for Yazidis. About 250 people attended the funeral.

=== Manhunt ===
The public prosecutor's office in Verden offered a 10,000 euro reward for information leading to the arrest of the perpetrator. The case was broadcast twice in September 2013 in the program Aktenzeichen XY… ungelöst on ZDF. The perpetrator could not be caught until today (2025).

=== Motive for murder ===
The exact motive for the murder of the perpetrator is unknown, as the perpetrator has not yet been caught. According to SPIEGEL, the perpetrator's motive for murder could have been custody of the child, which the district of Nienburg wanted to withdraw from the parents. The Stuttgarter Zeitung stated that the perpetrator killed his daughter because she wanted a life of freedom.

== Court process ==
In the Souzan Barakat case, the first trial took place on 4 December 2012. A 60-year-old doctor from Landesbergen was accused. The doctor was accused of having prepared an incorrect certificate on the state of health of the Souzan Barakat. The accused refused to testify. The process is to be continued.

== Reactions ==
The Central Council of Ezidis in Germany, which was formerly based in Oldenburg, condemned the murder of the Yazidi girl Souzan Barakat by her father Ali Askar Hasso Barakat and described the act as an "inhumane act". According to a spokesman for the Central Council of Ezidis in Germany, the crime is incompatible with Yazidi culture.
