= Mittelweser =

Mittelweser may refer to the following places in northern Germany:

- the central part of the river Weser
- Middle Weser Valley (German: Mittleres Wesertal)
- Middle Weser Region
- Mittelweser (Samtgemeinde), a Samtgemeinde in the district of Nienburg
