= Landesbergen (Samtgemeinde) =

Municipality in Germany

Coordinates: 52.551°N 9.162°E

Samtgemeinde Landesbergen in NI

Landesbergen is a former Samtgemeinde ("collective municipality") in the district of Nienburg, in Lower Saxony, Germany. Its seat was in the village Landesbergen. At the 1 November 2011 local government reform, the Samtgemeinde Landesbergen and the municipality Stolzenau formed the new Samtgemeinde Mittelweser.

The Samtgemeinde Landesbergen consisted of the following municipalities:

1. Estorf
2. Husum
3. Landesbergen
4. Leese

== Geography ==
The area of the collective municipality lies predominantly in the region of the Middle Weser Valley.

== Bibliography ==
- Landesbetrieb für Statistik und Kommunikationstechnologie Niedersachsen, Hanower, 2009
