= Jobst II of Hoya =

German nobleman (1493–1545)

Jobst II, Count of Hoya
- Born: 1493
- Died: 25 April 1545
- Buried: St. Martin church in Nienburg
- Noble family: House of Hoya
- Spouse: Anna of Gleichen
- Issue Detail: Albert; Eric V; Otto
- Father: Jobst I, Count of Hoya
- Mother: Ermengarde of Lippe

Count Jobst II of Hoya (1493 – 25 April 1545) ruled the County of Hoya from 1511 until his death.

== Life ==
=== Family ===
He was the eldest son of Count Jobst I and his wife, Ermengarde of Lippe. After the early death of his father in 1507, a regency council was formed, consisting of the Count of Spiegelberg, the Lord of Diepholz and his mother.

His younger brother John VII entered into Swedish service and became governor of Vyborg. His brother Eric IV inherited the Stolzenau section of the county. His sisters Anna and Elisabeth were canonesses of Vreden Abbey and Essen Abbey.

=== Reign ===
After a feudal dispute, the County of Hoya was occupied by Dukes Henry the Middle and Henry the Elder of Brunswick-Lüneburg in 1512. Jobst and his family found refuge with Count Edzard I of East Frisia. In 1519, a compromise was found and Hoya was returned to Jobst, after he paid a huge sum of money.

Jobst introduced the Reformation in the county of Hoya. He was a supporter of Martin Luther as early as 1523. In 1525, Luther sent the theologian Adrian Buxschott to Hoya. In 1532, Jobst dissolved the abbey in Bücken and other monasteries in Hoya; only the abbey in Bassum was allowed to continue as a befitting place for unmarried daughters of the nobility.

Jobst's reign saddled the county with heavy debts and mortgages on many manors. He also left unresolved disputes with his creditors.

=== Death ===
Jobst and his wife both died in 1545. They were buried in the St. Martin church in Nienburg. Her tomb is located in the hall below the church tower.

== Marriage and issue ==
Jobst married Anna of Gleichen and had the following children:

- Albert (1526–1563), Count of Hoya 1545–1563
- Eric V (1535–1575), Count of Hoya 1563–1575
- Otto (1530–1582), Count of Hoya 1575–1582
- Margaret, (1527–1596), abbess of Bassum Abbey 1541–1549, married Rudolph of Diepholz in 1549 Rudolf
- Jobst (1528–1546), canon of Cologne
- Wolfgang (1531–1560), canon of Verden, Cologne and Strasbourg
- Magdalene (1532–1545)
- Anna (1533–1585), Abbess in Bassum 1549–1584
- Mary (1534–1589), married on 7 May 1554 Hermann Georg of Limburg
- John (b. 1536), canon in Bücken
- Ermengarda (1537–1575), married John of Buren
- Elise (1538–1548)
- Frederick (b. 1540), Canon in Strasbourg

After Jobst's death, his sons Albert, Eric and Otto successively ruled Hoya. They all died without a male heir. With Otto's death, the House of Hoya died out in 1582.
