= Middle Weser Valley =

Coordinates: 52°21′13″N 8°58′13″E

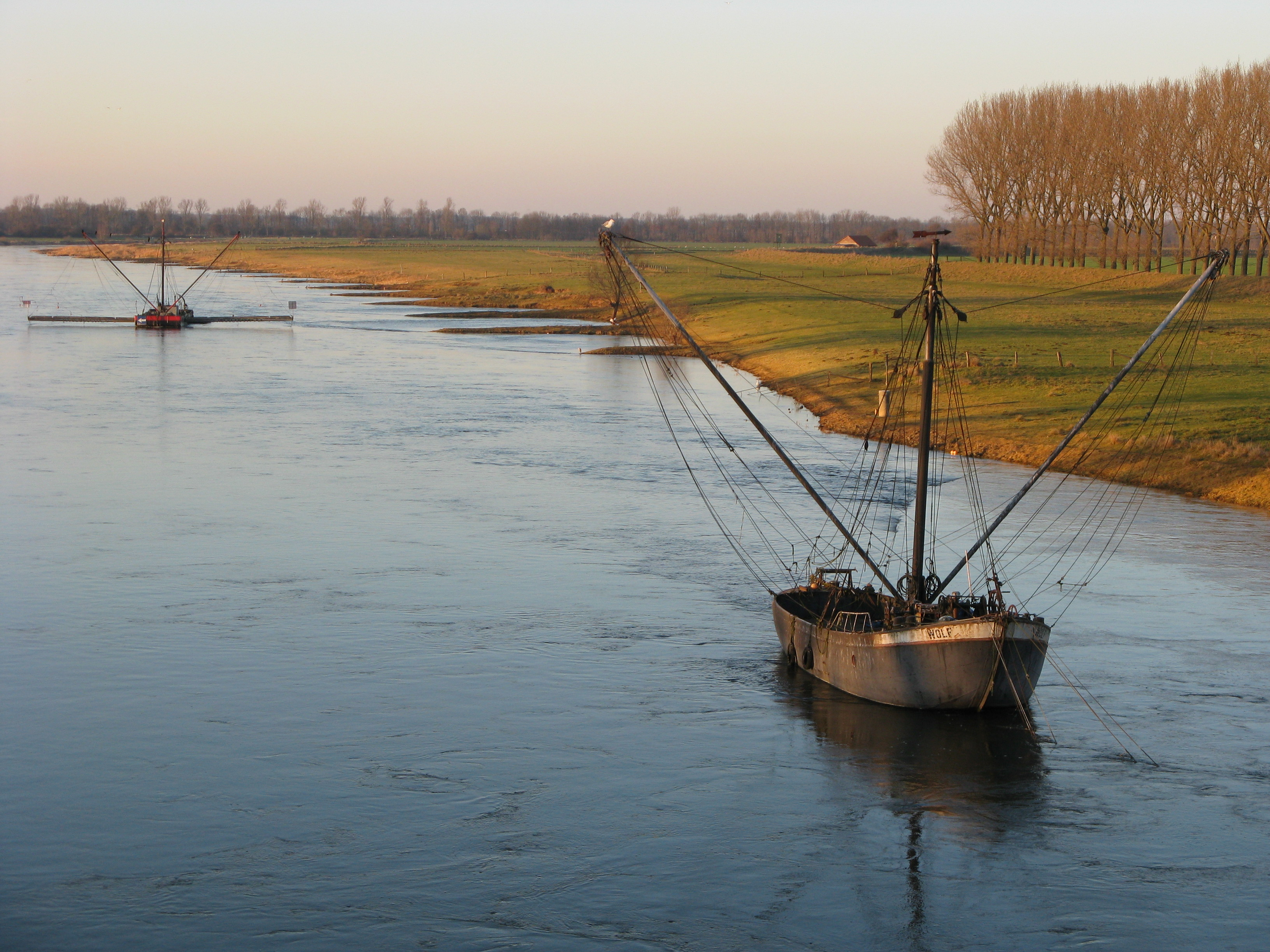
View of the Weseraue from the Staustufe Schlüsselburg

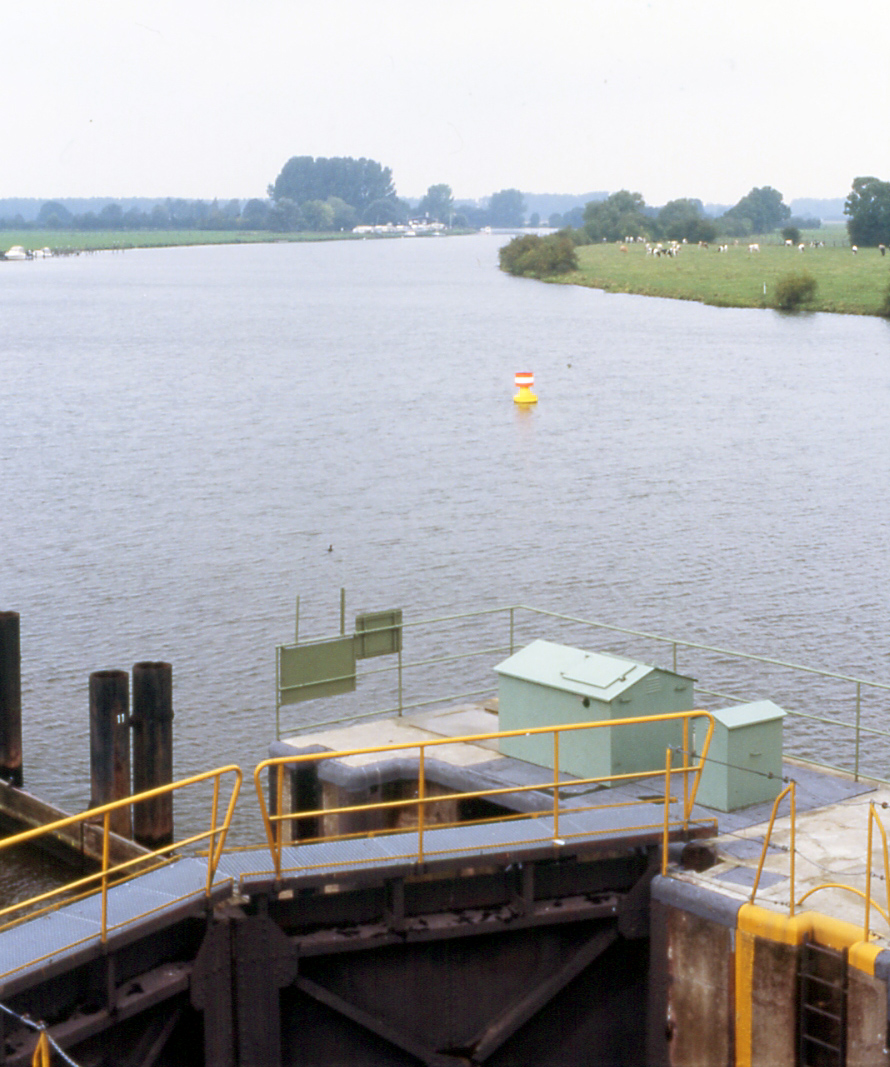
The Middle Weser near Drakenburg, in the foreground the Drakenburg Weir

The Middle Weser Valley (German: Mittlere Wesertal) is part of the Weser Depression around the River Weser on the North German Plain, extending from the gap of Porta Westfalica to the town of Hoya. It is not a true valley, because it is only bordered by low hills at two points. It lies in the German federal states of Lower Saxony and North Rhine-Westphalia.

== Course ==
The so-called Middle Weser Valley begins where the actual Weser Valley (in the Weser Uplands) ends at the Porta Westfalica gap between the Wiehen Hills on the west and the Weser Hills on the east. By its formal definition, the Middle Weser begins ten kilometres further north at the Minden Aqueduct, flowing across the North German Plain through Petershagen and Nienburg. Conceptually, the Middle Weser Valley ends near Hoya, where the Middle Weser reaches the Breslau-Magdeburg-Bremen glacial valley.

As a natural region the Middle Weser Valley, which consists of flood plains and river terraces, is a strip of land up to 10 kilometres (6.2 mi) wide on both sides of the Middle Weser. It is counted as part of the Dümmer Geest Depression and the Middle Weser Region. Of particular note are the Weseraue and Staustufe Schlüsselburg nature reserves.

== Political division ==
The towns of Porta Westfalica, Minden and Petershagen all lie in that part of the Middle Weser Valley that within North Rhine-Westphalia, in the district of Minden-Lübbecke. On the Lower Saxon side of the border, in the district of Nienburg/Weser, the Middle Weser Valley is home to the municipalities of Stolzenau, Landesbergen, Steyerberg, Weser-Aue, Nienburg/Weser, Heemsen, Eystrup and Hoya.

== Sources ==
- Emil Meynen (Hrsg.): Handbuch der naturräumlichen Gliederung Deutschlands, Selbstverlag der Bundesanstalt für Landeskunde, Remagen 1959-1962 (Teil 2, enthält Lieferung 6-9), ISBN B0000BJ19F
