= Middle Weser Region =

Coordinates: 52.575098°N 9.109039°E

The Middle Weser Region (German: Mittelweserregion) includes, in its fullest sense, the land along the Middle Weser between Minden and Bremen. It lies within the federal states of North Rhine-Westphalia, Lower Saxony and Bremen. However, the term is often used just to refer to the Lower Saxon part, because of the different political development of the three states and the cooperative associations formed in Lower Saxony some years ago (see below). The Lower Saxon part of the Middle Weser Region forms the geographical heart of this state. In the centre of the Middle Weser Region are the towns of Minden, Nienburg/Weser and Verden (Aller). In the extreme north, the city of Bremen, which is not part of Lower Saxony, has a very important influence on that area of Lower Saxony surrounding it.

For information about the Westphalian part of the Middle Weser Region see also Ostwestfalen-Lippe and Minden Land

== Landscape ==
The Middle Weser Region is part of the North German Plain. On either side of the Weser and its tributaries are broad marsh, geest (topography) and bog landscapes with original forests. Other parts of the region are used for agriculture. The southern part of the Middle Weser Region belongs to the Middle Weser Valley which is joined by the glacial valley of the Aller in the north.

== Historic territories ==
- Bishopric of Verden
- Diocese of Minden
- County of Hoya
- Kingdom of Hanover
- Duchy of Brunswick
- Kingdom of Prussia
- County of Wölpe
- Bremen-Verden

== Cuisine ==
- Fish recipes using fish from the Weser and its tributaries
  - Eel
  - Trout
  - Perch
  - Carp
- Asparagus (Spargel)
- Potatoes and potato products
- Grünkohl and Pinkel
- Knipp
- Mustard (condiment) and vinegar from Eystrup
- Bilberries (Bickbeeren)

== Tourist attractions ==
- Town centres of Verden (Aller), Hoya, Nienburg/Weser, Petershagen and Minden
- Verden Cathedral
- Minden Cathedral
- Heritage railways of Bruchhausen-Vilsen, Thedinghausen and Verden (Aller)
- Car museum in Asendorf
- Spa facilities in Bad Rehburg
- Passenger boats on the Middle Weser
- Bücken church
- Loccum Abbey
- Erbhof Thedinghausen
- Etelsen Castle
- Petershagen Castle
- Herring fishing museum in Heimsen
- Meyersiek Mill (second oldest mill in Lower Saxony) in Steyerberg

=== Participating administrative bodies and communal associations ===
- Bruchhausen-Vilsen (Samtgemeinde)
- Eystrup (Samtgemeinde)
- Grafschaft Hoya (Samtgemeinde)
- Heemsen (Samtgemeinde)
- Landesbergen (Samtgemeinde)
- Langwedel
- Nienburg/Weser
- Rehburg-Loccum
- Steimbke (Samtgemeinde)
- Steyerberg
- Stolzenau
- Thedinghausen (Samtgemeinde)
- Weser-Aue
- Nienburg district

=== Other administrative bodies in the Middle Weser Region ===
- Achim
- Dörverden
- Uchte (Samtgemeinde)
- Verden (Aller)
- Petershagen
- Minden
- Minden-Lübbecke district
- Verden district
