= Johann IV of Osnabrück =

German nobleman and prince-bishop (1529–1574)

The Most Reverend Johann von Hoya
- Prince-Bishop of Osnabrück
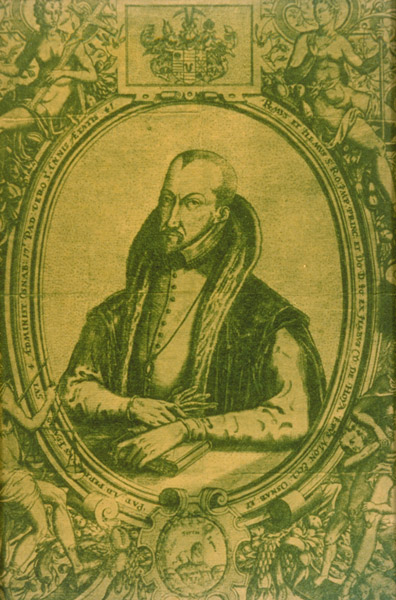
- Church: Roman Catholic
- Appointed: 5 October 1553
- Term ended: 5 April 1574
- Predecessor: Franz von Waldeck
- Successor: Henry of Saxe-Lauenburg (Lutheran)

Orders
- Ordination: 4 October 1567 by Johannes Kridt
- Consecration: 5 October 1567 by Johannes Kridt

Personal details
- Born: 18 April 1529; Wiborg
- Died: 5 April 1574 (aged 44); Ahaus Castle
- Parents: John VII of Hoya (father); Margareta Eriksdotter Vasa (mother)

Johann IV of Osnabrück (18 April 1529 – 5 April 1574) was a German nobleman and prince-bishop. From his father Johann VII's death in 1535 onwards he was known as Count (Graf) Johann VIII von Hoya zu Stolzenau. From 1553 (as Johann IV) he was Prince-Bishop of Osnabrück, then from 1566 (as Johann III) Prince-Bishop of Münster and finally from 1568 (as Johann II) administrator of the Bishopric of Paderborn.

== Family and education ==
He was born in Viborg to Count John VII of Hoya, his father who was a military colonel and governor in Swedish and Lübian military service and killed in the Count's Feud in 1534. His mother Margareta Eriksdotter Vasa was the sister of King Gustav I of Sweden. He remained unmarried and was the last of his family.

He likely received his early education in Sweden, Reval, and Danzig. In 1547 he was initially assigned the sub-county of Stolzenau. He then went to Paris where he was kindly received by Henry II at the royal court. When France's war with the Reich broke out he went to Italy - referred to as a cleric from Minden - and studied law. He was an educated man and is said to have mastered seven languages. A problem for an intellectual career was his descent from the House of Vasa, since this was partly not considered to be of knightly birth and therefore not eligible for a foundation. Attempts to secure him the position of Archbishop of Cologne are said to have failed.

Hoya therefore initially decided to pursue a career in the imperial judiciary. In 1553, Emperor Charles V appointed him as an assessor to the Imperial Chamber Court.

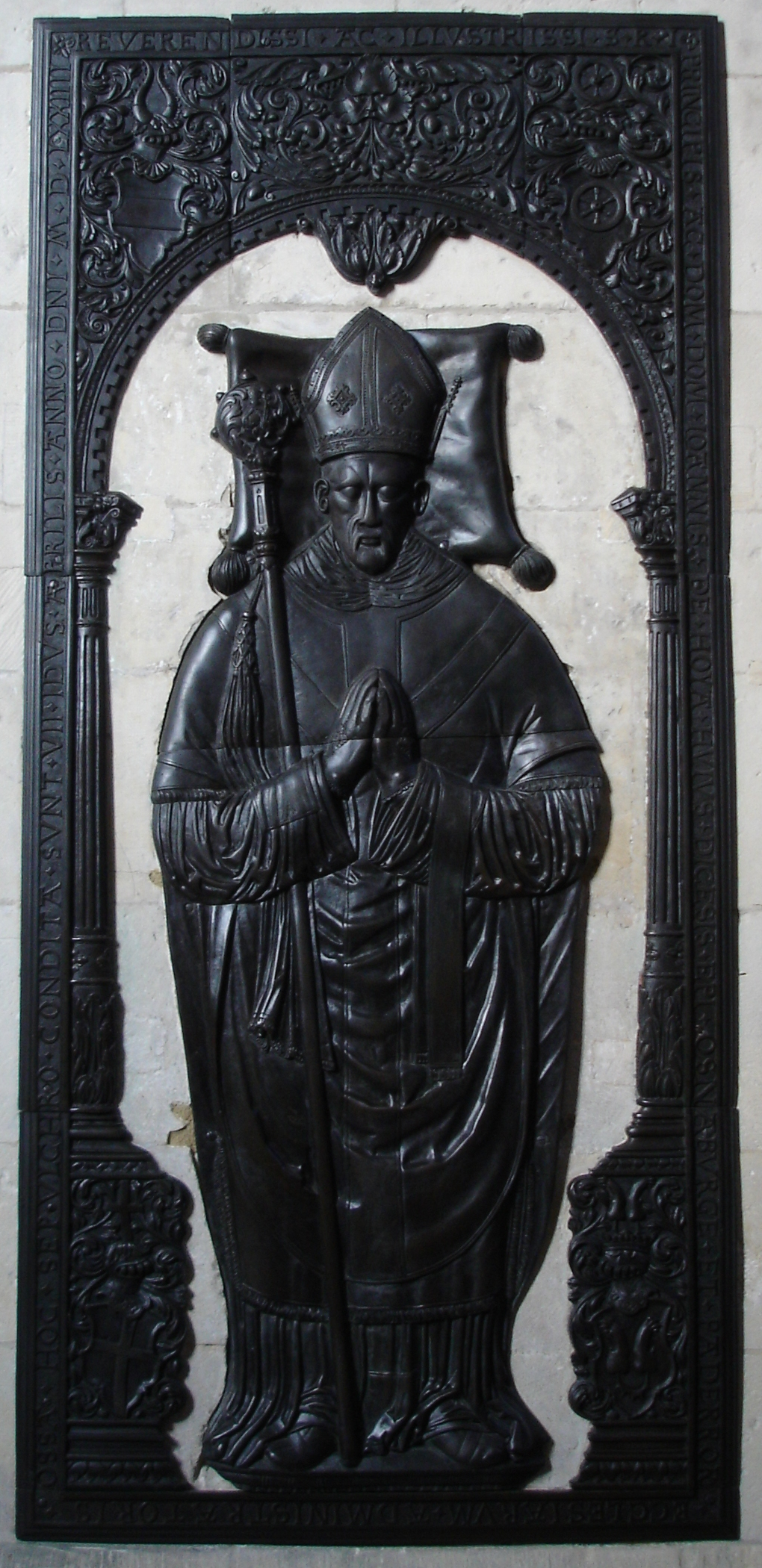
Epitaph for Bishop Johann von Hoya in Münster Cathedral

== Bishop ==
In Osnabrück he received a position as a canon, and the cathedral chapter elected him bishop, which was confirmed by the Pope a year later. Between 1555 and 1557 he nevertheless served as President of the Imperial Chamber Court. As a result of the payment of 29,000 guilders extorted from the diocese of Osnabrück by Philipp Magnus von Braunschweig-Wolfenbüttel, von Hoya felt compelled to sell the dominions of Stolzenau and Steyerberg to Count Albrecht von Hoya in 1562. Since he became more and more dependent on the estates due to the economic emergency, he concluded a protection contract with Philip II of Spain in 1555 and took over the obligation to defend England against Scotland in 1560 against payment of money. In the Bishopric of Osnabrück he issued new official regulations in 1556 and feudal law in 1561.

His attitude towards Protestantism was seen as too soft. In fact, in military disputes he tended to support the Protestant side. A commission of several cardinals and the Jesuit Peter Canisius visited Hoya in 1565 to assure himself of his Catholic stance. From 1561 Hoya tried unsuccessfully to found a Jesuit college in Osnabrück. However, he managed to keep the cathedral school Catholic. In 1570 he recognized the resolutions of the Council of Trent for the diocese of Osnabrück. In 1566 he was also elected bishop of Munster. He then recognized the Trent Creed and was ordained. He lost the election de jure his episcopate in Osnabrück, but in fact remained as administrator there as well as prince-bishop. In 1568 he was also elected Bishop of Paderborn. Due to the ban on the accumulation of offices after the Council of Trent, he was officially only the administrator of the bishopric.

In the electoral capitulation in Münster, he promised energetic action against church abuses, sects and religious innovations. There can be no doubt about the goal of sticking to it, but for him the improvement of the government and the reform of the judiciary were also the more important concerns in the two new monasteries.

At the urging of the Münster cathedral chapter and after a papal warning, he had a general church inspection carried out in 1571. The situation in Paderborn was determined by its proximity to Protestant Hesse. His policy there tried to avoid conflicts with the neighbor. This led to the suspicion that John of Hoya allowed the Protestants to do their thing.

Overall, he strove for a fundamental reform of church administration, but his successes in defending Catholicism in the diocese of Osnabrück were limited.

He died on 5 April 1574 in Schloss Ahaus.

== Bibliography (in German) ==
- Heinrich Detmer (1881). "Johann, Graf von Hoya". Allgemeine Deutsche Biographie (in German). Vol. 14. Leipzig: Duncker & Humblot. pp. 246–250.
- Richard Doebner (1881). "Johann IV., Bischof von Osnabrück". Allgemeine Deutsche Biographie (in German). Vol. 14. Leipzig: Duncker & Humblot. p. 278.
- Wolfgang Seegrün (1972). "Hoya, Johann IV. von". Neue Deutsche Biographie (in German). Vol. 9. Berlin: Duncker & Humblot. pp. 666–666. (full text online).
- Wilhelm Kohl: Die Bistümer der Kirchenprovinz Köln. Das Bistum Münster 7,3: Die Diözese. Berlin, 2003 ISBN 978-3-11-017592-9 (Germania Sacra NF. Bd 37,3)
- Franz-Josef Jakobi: Reformer in Zeiten des Umbruchs: Fürstbischof Johann von Hoya (1566–1574), Domdechant Gottfried von Raesfeld (1569–1586) und das Fürstbistum Münster in nachtridentinischer Zeit. In: Westfalen, Hefte für Geschichte, Kunst und Volkskunde. 83. Bd. (2005); S. 138–151; Münster 2008. S. 586ff.
- Elisabeth Kloosterhuis: Fürstbischof Johann von Hoya und das Eindringen der Reichsjustiz in den Fürstbistümern Münster, Osnabrück und Paderborn zwischen 1566 und 1574. In: Westfälische Zeitschrift. 142. 1992, S. 57–117.
- Monique Weis: Diplomatischer Briefwechsel in schwierigen Zeiten. Fürstbischof Johann von Hoya und die spanischen Niederlande (1566–1574). In: Westfälische Zeitschrift. 154. 2004, S. 53–69.
