= Jobst I of Hoya =

German nobleman (1460–1507)

Jobst I, Count of Hoya
- Born: c. 1460
- Died: 6 January 1507
- Noble family: House of Hoya
- Spouse: Ermengarda of Lippe
- Issue Detail: Jobst II; John VII
- Father: John V, Count of Hoya
- Mother: Elizabeth of Diepholz

Jobst I, Count of Hoya (c. 1460 – 6 January 1507) was the ruling Count of Upper Hoya from 1466 to 1503 and Count of Hoya from 1503 until his death.

== Life ==
Jobst was a son of Count John V of Hoya and Elizabeth of Diepholz. Since his father married fairly late, Jobst was not yet old enough to govern the county when he inherited it in 1466. His uncle Albert Jobst, Bishop of Minden to up the regency.

Jobst had two brothers, Eric and John. They did not reach adulthood.

During his reign, the branch of the House of Hoya which ruled Lower Hoya died out in the male line. This led to a dispute between Jobst and the Dukes of Brunswick-Lüneburg about who should inherit. In 1504, Jobst had to relinquish his imperial immediacy and accept the County of Hoya as a fief from the Dukes of Brunswick-Lüneburg. He had to pay a large sum of money to receive this fief. This debt burdened the Counts of Hoya for the rest of the 16th century and caused the financial decline of the family.

== Marriage and issue ==
In 1488, Jobst married Ermengarda of Lippe. They had six children:

- Jobst II (1493–1545), succeeded Jobst I as Count of Hoya
- John VII, (d. 1535), a commander in the Swedish army
- Eric IV, (d. 1547), ruler of Hoya-Stolzenau
- Anna, canoness in Vreden Abbey
- Elisabeth, abbess in Essen Abbey
- Mary, married Jodok of Bronckhorst and Boekelo
