= Otto VIII of Hoya =

Otto VIII, Count of Hoya
- Born: 1530
- Died: 25 February 1582; Hoya Castle, Hoya
- Buried: Church of St. Martin in Nienburg
- Noble family: House of Hoya
- Spouse: Agnes of Bentheim-Steinfurt
- Father: Jobst II, Count of Hoya
- Mother: Anna of Gleichen

Otto VIII, Count of Hoya (1530 – 25 February 1582 at Hoya Castle in Hoya, Germany) was the last ruling Count of Hoya.

== Life ==
Otto was the third son of Count Jobst II and his wife Anna of Gleichen. At first, he was canon in Cologne and Verden. After the childless death of his older brother Albert II in 1563, Otto VIII and his brother Eric V, took up government of the county.

Otto married in 1568 to Agnes of Bentheim-Steinfurt, the widow of Count John II of Rietberg, who was also the mother of Armgard, who was the wife of Otto's brother Eric. After Eric also died childless in 1575, Otto ruled the county alone.

"Otto, Count of Hoya and Burghausen," signed the Formula of Concord of 1577, and the Book of Concord of 1580.

Otto VIII died childless on 25 November 1582 at Hoya Castle. He was buried in the church of St. Martin in Nienburg; his tomb is located in the hall below the tower. With his death, the House of Hoya died out, and the county fell back to the Duchy of Brunswick-Lüneburg as a possession of Frederick Ulrich first and then of William August.
