= John V of Hoya =

Count of Hoya (c. 1395–1466, r. 1426–1466)

John V, Count of Hoya
- Born: c. 1395
- Died: 10 April 1466
- Buried: St. Martin's church in Nienburg
- Noble family: House of Hoya
- Spouse: Elisabeth of Diepholz
- Issue Detail: Jobst I, Count of Hoya
- Father: Eric I, Count of Hoya
- Mother: Helen of Brunswick-Lüneburg

John V, Count of Hoya (c. 1395 – 10 April 1466), nicknamed the Pugnacious, or the Wild, was the ruling Count of Hoya from 1426 until his death. He was the son of Count Eric I of Hoya and his wife Helen, the daughter of Duke Magnus II Torquatus. His brother Albert was Bishop of Minden. His brothers Eric and Otto were administrators of Münster and Bremen respectively.

== Reign ==
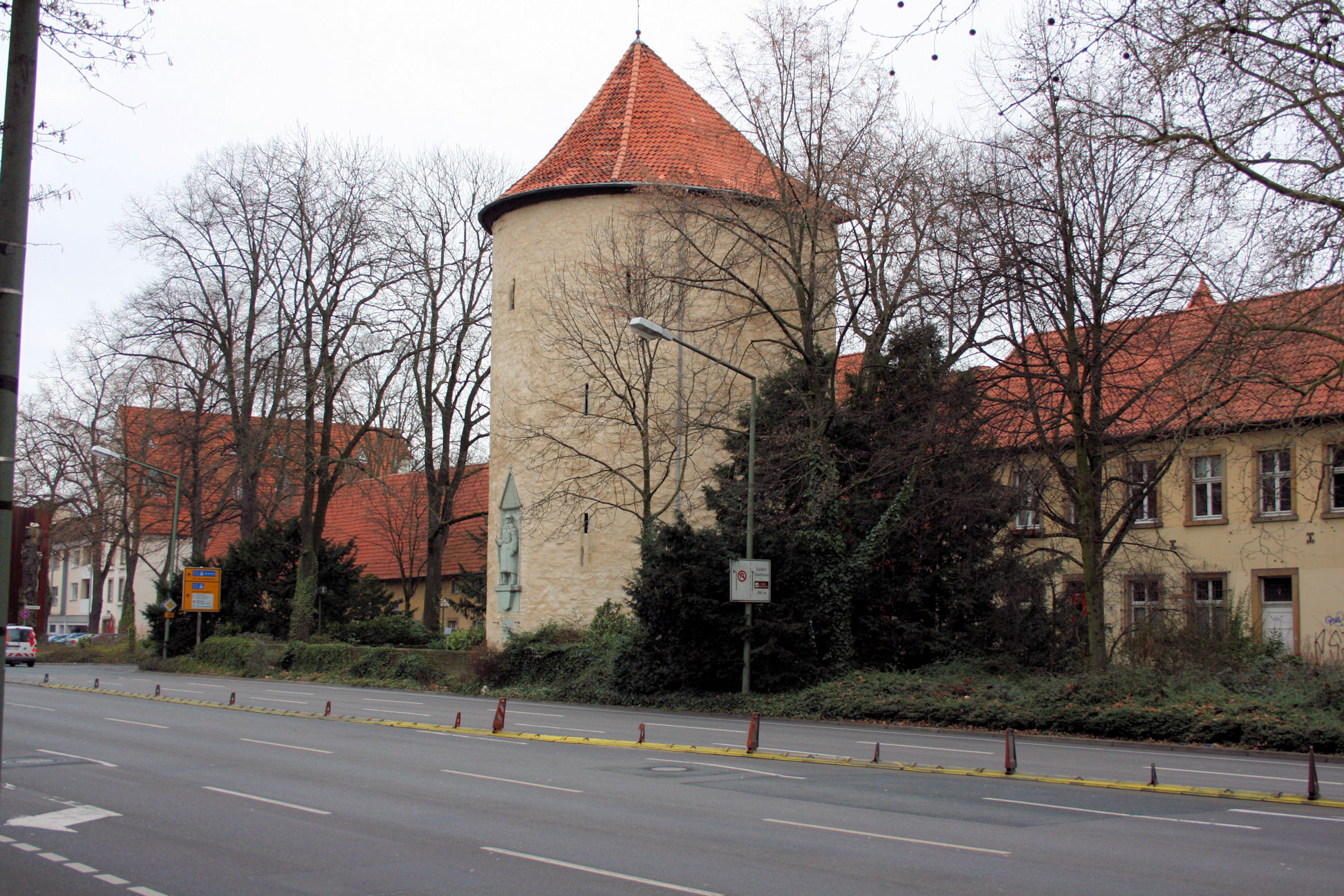
Bucksturm Tower, where John was held prisoner

John spent his life fighting wars and feuds. Shortly after he took up government, he fought in the Battle of Detern. Later, he fought wars against the cities of Lüneburg, Bremen and Osnabrück. In 1441, he was taken prisoner by the citizens of Osnabrück. He spent the next six years in the so-called Johanniskasten, a small oak dungeon cell in the Bucksturm tower. After he was released, he fought in the Feud of Soest and the Feud of Münster.

During his reign, the St. Martin's church in Nienburg was built. It was consecrated in 1441. John V died in 1466 and was buried in this church.

== Marriage and issue ==
In 1459, when he was already over sixty years old, he married Elisabeth of Diepholz. They had three sons:

- Jobst I, his successor
- Eric, died young
- Albert, also died young
