= Munster Rebellion (disambiguation) =

The Münster rebellion was a German uprising from 1534–1535.

Munster Rebellion may also refer to:

- Desmond Rebellions, Munster, Ireland, in 1569–1573 and 1579–1583

== See also ==
- Münster Feud, 1450–57 dispute over the appointment to the bishop's throne in Münster
- Munster Republic, nickname for the 1922 anti-Treaty stronghold during the Irish Civil War
