= Eric I =

Eric I may refer to:

- Erik Björnsson, Eric I of Sweden (early 9th century)
- Eric I of Norway, known as Eric Bloodaxe (died in 954)
- Eric I of Denmark (c. 1060 – 1103)
- Eric I, Duke of Schleswig (died in 1272)
- Eric I, Duke of Saxe-Lauenburg (c. 1280 – 1360)
- Eric I, Duke of Mecklenburg (after 1359 – 1397)
- Eric I, Count of Hoya (1370–1426), German nobleman, ruling Count of Upper Hoya 1377–1426
- Eric of Pomerania, Duke Eric I of Stolp (1381 or 1382 – 1459)
- Eric I, Duke of Brunswick-Lüneburg, reigning prince of Calenberg-Göttingen, also known as Eric the Elder (1470 – 1540)
- Eric I, Duke of Brunswick-Grubenhagen, reigning prince of Grubenhagen, also known as Eric the Winner (c. 1383 – 1427)
