= John VII of Hoya =

- arms of the House of Hoya
- Died: 11 June 1535 near Assens
- Noble family: House of Hoya
- Spouse: Margareta Eriksdotter Vasa
- Father: Jobst I, Count of Hoya
- Mother: Irmgard of Lippe

John VII of Hoya (died 11 June 1535, fell in battle near Assens on Funen in Denmark) was a German count and army commander in the service of Lübeck and Sweden.

His parents were Count Jobst I of Hoya (1466–1507) and Irmgard of Lippe (1469–1524).

== Life ==
On 15 January 1525, he married Margareta Eriksdotter Vasa, the widow of Joakim Brahe (d. 1520 during the Stockholm Bloodbath), and sister of the King Gustav I of Sweden. In 1525, he was appointed governor of Vyborg and in the same year, he renounced his rights on Hoya, in favor of his brothers, in exchange for 16000 guilders.

In 1533, he was involved in a conspiracy against the King. The conspiracy failed, and John VII had to flee to Tallinn. He later returned to Germany and became the chief military commander of Lübeck.

During the Count's Feud, he fought in Denmark against Christopher of Oldenburg. He attempted to occupy the island of Funen, however, his army was trounced at Mount Ochsenberg, near Assens, by a Danish army led by Johann Rantzau. John VII fell in that battle, as did many other noblemen, among them Nicholas of Tecklenburg, the Burgrave of Dohna, and Gustav Trolle, the Bishop of Uppsala.

== Marriage and issue ==
On 15 January 1525, he married Margareta Eriksdotter Vasa (d. 31 December 1536 in Tallinn). They had two sons:

- John (1529–1574), bishop of Osnabrück.
- Jobst, co-adjutor in Cologne. He was captured by Franz von Halle and died in prison.
