= Münster Diocesan Feud =

Dispute concerning dominion over the Bishopric of Münster

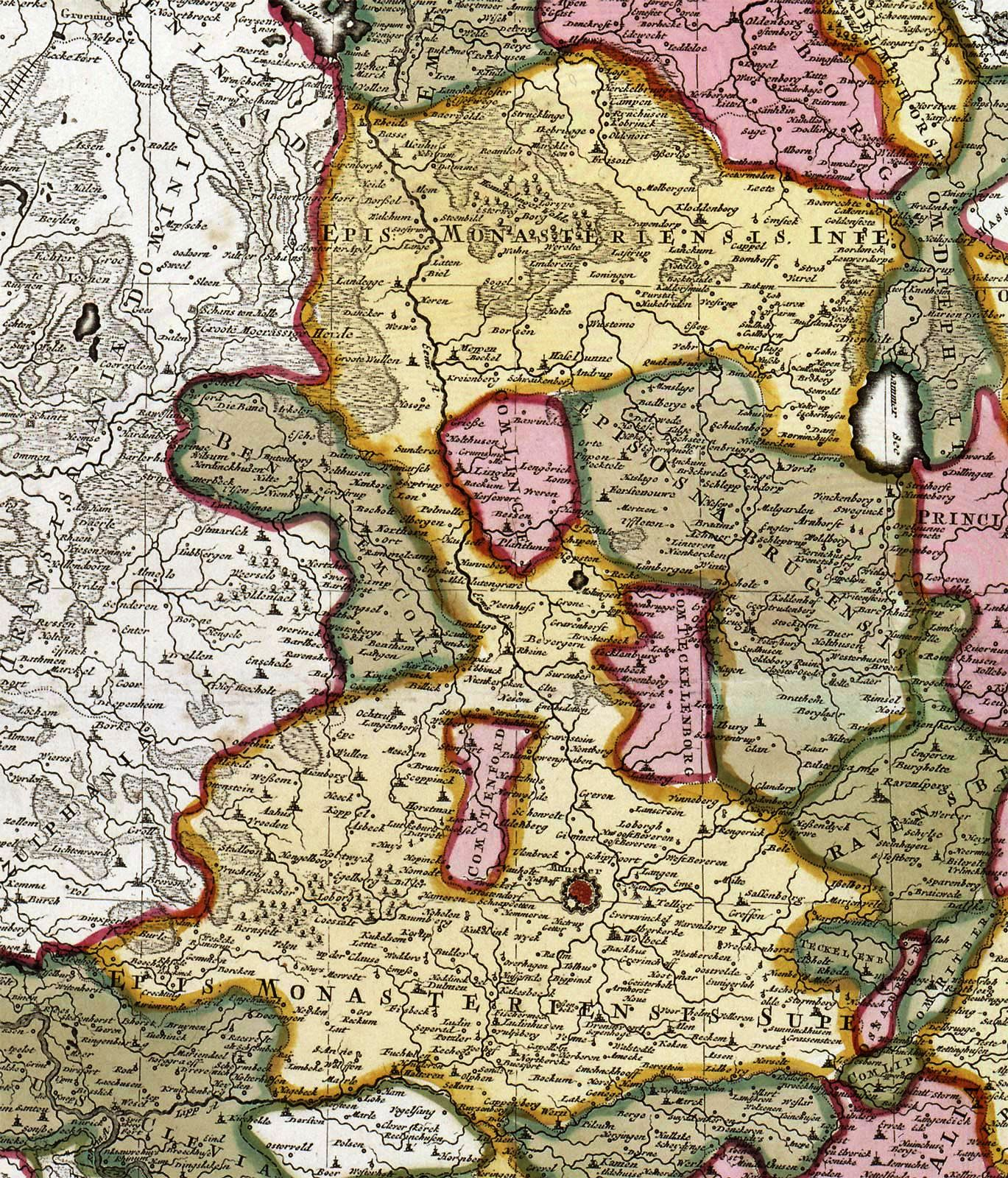
- The Prince-Bishopric of Münster (section of an 18th-century map of the Westphalian Circle)
Date	1450 – 1457
Location	Prince-Bishopric of Münster

Belligerents
County of Hoya; Duchy of Cleves	County of Moers; Electorate of Cologne	Lordship of Diepholz; Prince-Bishopric of Utrecht

Commanders and leaders
Eric of Hoya; John V of Hoya	Walram of Moers; Dietrich of Moers	Conrad of Diepholz; Rudolf of Diepholz

The Münster Diocesan Feud (German: Münsterische Stiftsfehde), or simply Münster Feud, was a dispute that took place between 1450 and 1457 over the appointment to the bishop's throne in Münster, and hence the rule of the diocese. The cause was the death of the previous prince-bishop, Henry II of Moers. The opposing candidates were his brother Walram of Moers, Eric of Hoya, and Conrad of Diepholz. They were supported by their families with Count John of Hoya, Archbishop Dietrich II of Moers and Prince-Bishop Rudolf of Diepholz at their respective heads. In addition, there were also external allies. Within the diocese the Stände, namely the cathedral chapter and the town of Münster, played an independent role at times. In the end neither candidate was able to succeed to the office.

== Background ==
The Diocese of Münster was one of the largest and most important ecclesial territories in the northwest German area. In the Late Middle Ages the bishop's thrones in the region were predominantly filled by members of comital families or the families of hereditary noblemen (Edelherren). These families, like the counts of the Mark, attempted to secure episcopal seats for their sons. Even less powerful families took the opportunity to increase their influence, at least occasionally, over an ecclesial territory. To this group belonged the lords of Lippe, who occupied the bishop's throne in Paderborn several times. The counts of Hoya were successful in the Bishopric of Osnabrück. In the Bishopric of Minden this was true of the houses of Diepholz and Schaumburg. In the mid-15th century, however, the counts of Moers were foremost in this regard. Especially after Dietrich of Moers had become Archbishop of Cologne, the family was able to secure the majority of the bishop's seats in the northwest German area. Their main rival in the Bishopric of Münster was the Hoya family.

Internally, some of the prince-bishops, most recently Otto IV of Hoya (r. 1392–1424), had expanded their territory and got rid of smaller internal lordships. By contrast it was clear that the bishops in the 13th and 14th centuries had largely lost control of their capital, Münster. The city acted independently almost as if it were a rich imperially immediate city. In addition, the Stände (estates), the cathedral chapter, knights and towns had gained influence and sharply reduced the power of the bishops.

After the death of Bishop Otto IV, Dietrich of Moers succeeded in getting his brother, Henry II of Moers, into the Münster bishopric against the will of the city of Münster. After the archbishop, due to internal diocesan disputes, had secured the Bishopric of Osnabrück for Eric of Hoya (German: Erich von Hoya), he placed Henry there as administrator. He oriented his policy sharply towards his brother's interests and supported him strongly during the Feud of Soest. The House of Hoya, who also held the bishoprics of Verden and Minden, saw the counts of Moers as intruders in their own area of interest. Apart from the Archdiocese of Cologne, Münster and Osnabrück, the House of Moers ruled Paderborn and parts of the Prince-Bishopric of Utrecht. The warlike stance of Henry in supporting his brother did not help the diocese, rather it resulted in a sharp increase in its debt and a decline in prosperity.

In addition to the two main rivals for the episcopacy, there were other contenders. The town of Osnabrück strongly supported Conrad of Diepholz (German: Konrad von Diepholz, Dutch: Koenraad van Diepholt). He was the cathedral provost (Dompropst) in Osnabrück and a nephew of the Prince-Bishop of Utrecht, Rudolf of Diepholz (Dutch: Rudolf van Diepholt). He supported the candidacy, but arrived too late to actively promote his nephew.

== Start of the conflict ==
Within the diocese, the estates were in open revolt by Henry's death. From now on, the aspirations of the House of Moers ran into resistance. Despite that, Dietrich did everything possible to continue to occupy Münster with a member of his family. As a successor he had provided his brother Walram of Moers (Dutch: Walraven van Meurs), but this brought him into conflict with the House of Hoya. John of Hoya had not forgotten that Dietrich of Moers was exchanged for members of his family. In particular, he had not forgotten his own six years imprisonment in connection with the fighting around Osnabrück. He wanted to make his brother, Eric of Hoya, successor.

Dietrich of Moers gave away large bribes to win a majority in the cathedral chapter for his brother. He had, until recently been a supporter of the Council of Basel, before he changed sides to the Roman curia. Dietrich succeeded in getting the majority of the cathedral chapter on side at a meeting in Hausdülmen on 15 July 1450. But John of Hoya campaigned for his brother, Eric. He won over the citizens of the city of Münster and the nobility to his cause. Within the city he was mainly supported by the guilds and the commoners, while the hereditary patricians on the council did not want confrontation.

John of Hoya was elected by the secular estates as the diocesan administrator (Stiftsverweser). He was to officiate until the Pope had appointed a bishop acceptable to both citizens and lords. In a letter to the Pope they explained their reasons for this unusual procedure were that Walram was allegedly responsible for two murders as well as other crimes in the past. By contrast, Eric of Hoya had led a supposedly blameless life and had had an academic education. A minority of thirteen canons and all the clergy of the city supported this position. In Osnabrück, John of Hoya, succeeded his brother Albert of Hoya to become the administrator. Thus, the position of the family was further strengthened in the battle for the Diocese of Münster.

As administrator, John of Hoya brought most of Münster's royal castles (Landesburgen) under his control. In order to reduce his own costs as far as possible, he seized the estates of the bishop and income of the cathedral canons (Domherren). In addition, he introduced an excise duty on trade goods. The supporters of Walram in the cathedral chapter were prepared to negotiate in this eventuality. An agreement was reached that the Hoyas largely honoured, according to which at the next Landtag all the estates would appeal to the Pope to award the office of bishop to Eric of Hoya. In return the canons were guaranteed their former rights and income. The Landtag approved this arrangement.

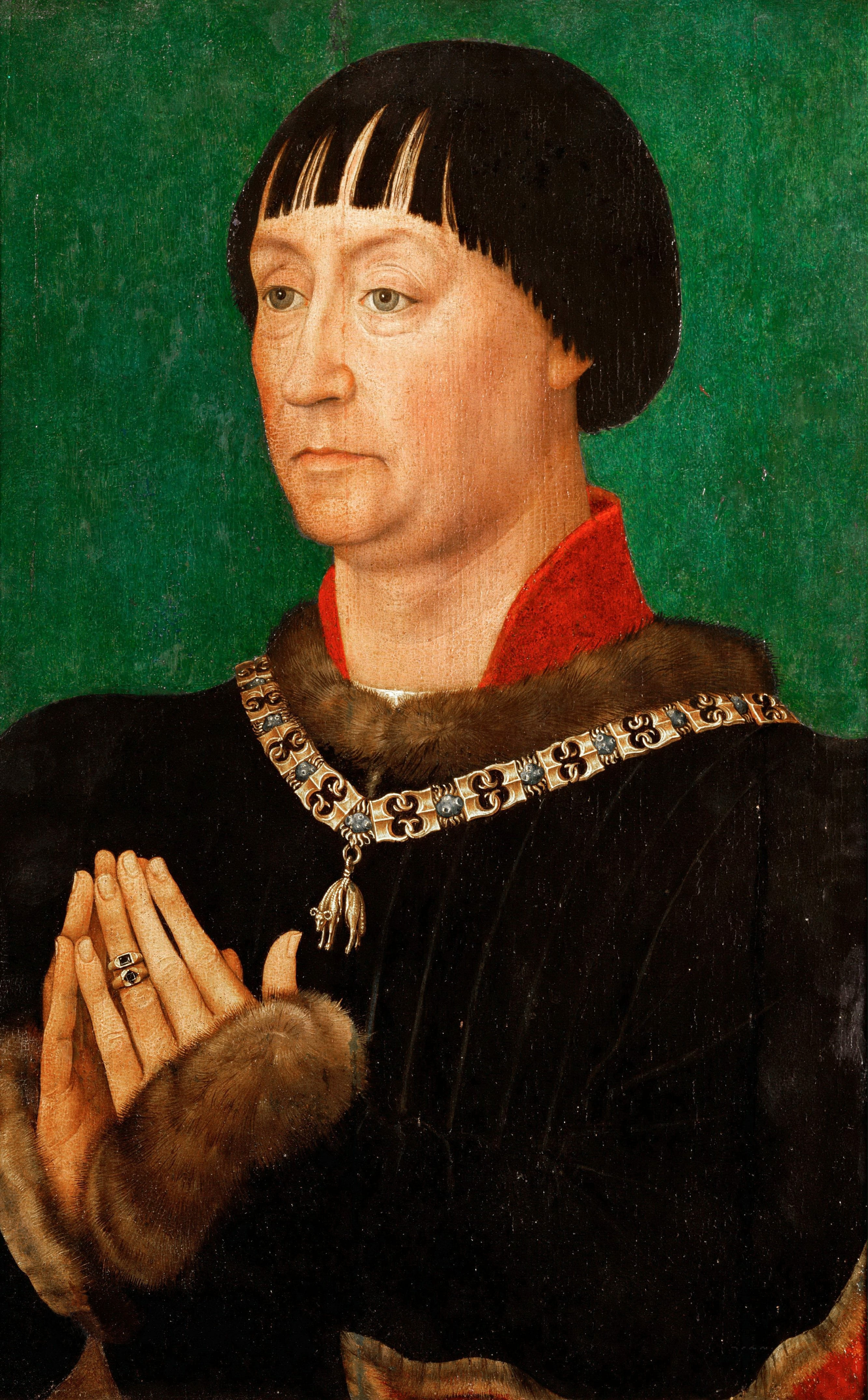
John of Cleves was one of the most important supporters of the Hoya party.

In January 1451, John of Hoya captured Dülmen Castle which had opposed him. Meanwhile, in ignorance of the unanimous support of the estates for Hoya, Pope Pope Nicholas V had appointed Walram of Moers as bishop. The town of responded to this by asking for a legal opinion from the University of Erfurt. Their judgement was that the estates did not have to accept the decision of the Pope because the Pope would not have known of Walram's unsuitability for the post.

The Hoya family were also supported by the Duchy of Cleves. Duke John of Cleves hoped thereby to weaken the power of the Archbishop of Cologne. On 11 June 1451, the Treaty of Haus Dülmen was signed, sealing an alliance between Cleves and John of Hoya. As a reward for his support in the battle against Walram of Moers Cleves was given the estates of Dülmen and Stromberg. Cleves was not just a valuable military ally. Also important was his advocacy through Philip of Burgundy, an uncle of the duke, in Rome. Following the signing of the treaty, Cleves declared war on Walram of Moers.

On the same day news arrived in Münster that Emperor Frederick III had conferred the regalia on Walram. After Walram had also received Papal confirmation, he removed several of his opponents from their high church offices and had the supporters of his opponent placed under a Papally-ordained interdict. Those affected appealed again to the University of Erfurt. The university judged the measures taken by Walram and the Archbishop of Cologne to be invalid. Philip of Burgundy intervened on behalf of the Hoya faction, writing a letter to Rome. Before taking any further steps, Rome decided to wait and see what position Nicholas of Cusa would take in this case.

== Outbreak of fighting ==
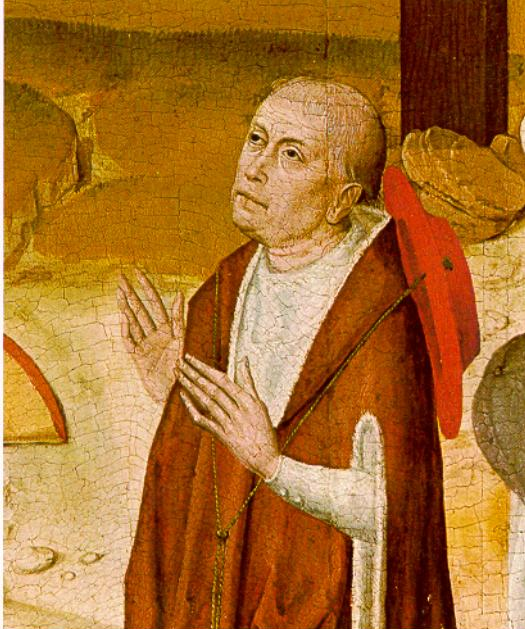
Cusa failed in his attempt to prevent an outbreak of fighting on behalf of the Pope.

Meanwhile, in the diocese, the feud broke out in the form of smaller operations. Most of the upper diocese was subsequently dominated by the Hoya faction; Walram only possessed the area around Ahaus, Vreden and Ottenstein.

Nicholas of Cusa was probably expected to instruct the Pope to replace both the earlier episcopal candidates with Conrad of Diepholz. Nicholas of Cusa, however, expressed opposition to the Hoyas. With the fall of Vreden, Walram also lost his last town in the Diocese of Moers. He notified Cusa on 21 January 1452 of his willingness to renounce the bishopric, provided it was possible to remove keep the Hoyas out and to make Conrad of Diepholz bishop instead.

The latter was supported inter alia by his uncle, Bishop Rudolf of Utrecht. From now on the Hoyas encountered increasingly strong military action, for example at the Siege of Ahaus. At the start of 1452 a mercenary arm defeated Hoya and the Münster troops and took large numbers of prisoners. On 2 February the supporters of Diepholz declared a feud against their opponents. Walram pledged the latter the remaining settlements he owned - Ahaus and Ottenstein - to Rudolf of Utrecht. In the diocese itself, sympathy grew for Conrad of Diepholz, whose candidature appeared to be an increasingly attractive alternative to the former aspirants. The estates sought therefore, on 6 October 1452 in Coesfeld, to reach a compromise, in order to get rid of both Walram of Moers and Eric of Hoya. All episcopal decisions since the death of Bishop Henry were declared null and void. In any case, these peace attempts failed. One reason was probably that John of Cleves continued to support Eric of Hoya.

John of Hoya, who had previously left the town, returned to Münster. Supported by the lower levels of the town of Münster, John of Hoya transferred the diocesan regency in 1453 de jure to his brother Eric, so that the latter could prove himself as regent. Although the mayors of the towns opposed this, they eventually had to accept it under pressure from their townsfolk. Eric of Hoya was thereupon rendered homage in all the towns.

== Spread of the conflict ==
This pitched the conflict into a new phase. Rudolf of Utrecht declared a feud against the town of Münster and its three allies on 7 July 1453. He succeeded in capturing the town of Vreden which, shortly thereafter was retaken by John of Hoya. Rudolf of Utrecht took advantage of disputes in the enemy camp and took a number of towns. Against the background of the triumphant advance of his opponent, in 1454 John of Hoya forced the re-election of the town council in Münster which was sympathetic to his cause. The majority of the council came from the guilds and the common people, only a few hereditary patricians (Erbmänner) were represented. In Münster resistance to the harsh rule of the Hoyas started to increase. Moreover, in October 1454, the Hansetag demanded the restoration of the old council constitution.

The allies around Walram of Moers and the Bishop of Utrecht managed to obtain assurances from the Pope, that all complaints from the opposite side to the Pope about spiritual penalties imposed by Walram were invalid. Those who aligned themselves with Walram were assured that they would receive absolution from any excommunication. Coesfeld was the first town to take advantage of the offer. This became the Walram's residence.

Because John of Cleves was temporarily unable to provide support due to his wedding, John of Hoya turned to Duke Frederick of Brunswick-Lüneburg with a request for assistance. With his help John of Hoya attacked, plundering and destroying, the area of Coesfeld and the County of Bentheim, which supported his enemies. Walram and Dietrich initially lacked the means to defend themselves against it. In July, a body of troops belonging to the archbishop arrived in Dülmen. Through a tactical mistake by Count John of Hoya, Duke Frederick's troops were alone when an allied army led by Dietrich of Moers, Walram of Moers, Rudolf of Utrecht, Bernard II of Bentheim, Bernard of Lippe and Conrad of Diepholz attacked and inflicted a crushing defeat on their opponents in the Battle of Varlar. The Duke was captured. One more vigorous attack might have brought total success, but the allies were hampered by internal disputes.

== Minor war and more negotiations ==
John of Hoya noticed that the mood in Münster was turning against him. He offered to transfer all the towns and castles to Cleves. But John of Cleves now had other plans. He wanted to give the diocese to Simon of Lippe, while Eric of Hoya was to get the Diocese of Osnabrück. He thus hoped that this would help to expel Bishop Rudolf from Utrecht. A short time later the latter died after he had ceded his rights to Ahaus and Ottenstein to Conrad of Diepholz. With his death, the allies of the House of Moers and Conrad of Diepholz lost their strongest supporter. The latter became Bishop of Osnabrück, but did not give up his aim of becoming the bishop in Münster as well.

In the Diocese of Münster, Walram of Moers continued to be opposed by John of Hoya. However, Dietrich of Moers did not pursue the matter with any great effort. So the fighting continued in the form of a minor war. In addition, negotiations took place which led to no result. One major success in early 1456 was the conquest of Coesfeld by John of Hoya. Then, in October 1456, Walram of Moers died in Arnhem. John of Hoya now relied on the support of the Duke of Burgundy. On behalf of Eric of Hoya he appealed for support to Pope Callistus III, who was hoping that Burgundy would help him win the Ottoman Wars. The strong support of Philip of Burgundy for Hoya's cause meant that the towns now aligned themselves more firmly on the side of John of Hoya than they had in recent years. Eric of Hoya was proposed as bishop by two of the canons. However, the majority of the canons chose Conrad of Diepholz. Both sides asked Rome for a decision.

John of Hoya sought to strengthen his position in Münster by obtained citizenship in early 1457 and joining the Blacksmiths' Guild. A short time later he was elected to the Council. However, the Pope decided upon John of Palatinate-Simmern, who had been totally uninvolved in the previous disputes. John of Hoya looked in vain to the support of Cleves and Burgundy once more. But even Conrad of Diepholz's aspiration to maintain his position failed.

== Outcome and aftermath ==
On 23 October 1457 the Treaty of Kranenburg was signed that ended the conflict. It stipulated that Eric of Hoya should receive a lifetime income equivalent to that of the Cologne provost office. The city of Münster undertook to recognize the new bishop, to allow him to enter the town and to pay homage to him. In return, the new bishop agreed to recognize the existing privileges of the town. The new bishop also recognized the enfeoffment of the estates of Dülmen and Stromberg to the Duke of Cleves. The latter also received compensation of 11,000 Rhenish guilders. In early November, the new bishop arrived in Münster, swore the oath of office and the electoral capitulation.

Earlier, John of Hoya had secretly left the town. Eric of Hoya died in 1458. Bevergern Castle which had been enfeoffed to him was returned to the diocese. After the peace treaty, life in the diocese quickly returned to normal. The dominant position that the patrician's (Erbmänner) had long held on Münster's town council was broken, as the guilds secured the right to be represented by their members. The Erbmänner only had half of the Council. In the end it was clear that the diocese had just become an object in the power game between noble families. The Emperor and Pope had lost any real influence. In the era of Henry and Walrams of Moers, some of the bishops had virtually lost any sense of their calling in faith to serve God and neighbour, but were simply out for themselves.

== Literature ==
- Wilhelm Kohl. Die Bistümer der Kirchenprovinz Köln. Das Bistum Münster 7,1: Die Diözese. Berlin, 1999. Germania Sacra, New Series, Vol. 37,1; ISBN 978-3-11-016470-1 (, p. 170, at Google Books), pp. 170–184.
- Wilhelm Kohl. Die Bistümer der Kirchenprovinz Köln. Das Bistum Münster 7,3: Die Diözese. Berlin, 2003. Germania Sacra, New Series, Vol. 37,3; ISBN 978-3-11-017592-9 (, p. 485, at Google Books), pp. 485–490.
- Joseph Hansen: Westfalen und Rheinland im 15. Jahrhundert, 2nd Volume: Die Münsterische Stiftsfehde, Leipzig, 1890 (= publications from the Royal Prussian State Archives, 42).
