= Albert II of Hoya =

Albert II, Count of Hoya
- Born: 1526
- Died: 18 March 1563
- Noble family: House of Hoya
- Spouse: Catherine of Oldenburg
- Father: Jobst II, Count of Hoya
- Mother: Anna of Gleichen

Albert II, Count of Hoya (1526 – 18 March 1563) was the ruling Count of Hoya from 1545 until his death.

== Life ==
Albert was the oldest son of Count Jobst II and his wife, Anna of Gleichen. After his father died in 1545, he initially ruled jointly with his brothers Eric V and Otto VIII. In 1553, his brother stepped down and Albert ruled alone.

In 1561, he married Catherine of Oldenburg. This marriage remained childless.

Albert II died in 1563. Hoya was inherited by Eric V, and when he, too, died childless, by Otto VIII. The House of Hoya died out when Otto died in 1582. Catherine survived them all, and died in 1620.
