= Lutz Meyer-Goßner =

German lawyer, jurist and law professor (born 1936)

Lutz Meyer-Goßner (born 10 July 1936) is a German lawyer, jurist and law professor. He was a judge of the Federal Court of Justice of Germany (Bundesgerichtshof) from 1983 to 2001.

Meyer-Goßner was born in Nienburg, Lower Saxony to Arnold Meyer and Liselotte geb. Goßner. His father was an evangelical pastor. He grew up in Celle, which is also in Lower Saxony, and attended the humanistic Gymnasium Ernestinum there, graduating in 1955. He studied law at the University of Tübingen and LMU Munich and passed his initial state law exam in 1959. In 1962, he received his doctorate from LMU Munich.

In 1964, after initial clerking, he was appointed as a deputy judge in the judicial service of the State of Bavaria. In 1967, he moved up to full district judge at the District Court of Munich. Concurrently with his appointment as judge, Meyer-Goßner undertook the job of working-group-leader over the research clerks of the court. In 1972, he was promoted and appointed head prosecutor. Beginning in 1975, Meyer-Goßner served as Chief Judge of the District Court of Munich, where he presided over the entire criminal division.

Meyer-Goßner received his appointment to the bench of the Federal Court in 1983, first hearing criminal cases. And then in 1992, he was appointed as deputy presiding judge of the court and in December 1994 as presiding judge. He retired on 31 July 2001 as presiding judge and from the court.

In addition to his demanding judicial duties, Meyer-Goßner also contributed to the profession as a commentator on the Criminal Procedure Code. Meyer-Goßner held a professorship at Marburg University, where he continued to teach criminal law and procedure after his judicial retirement.

He married Emily Meyer-Goßner in 1966 and has two grown children.

== Selected works ==
- Strafprozeßordnung: Gerichtsverfassungsgesetz, Nebengesetze und ergänzende Bestimmungen (2006)
- Kurzkommentar, der die Praxis des deutschen Strafprozesses (2017)

== Awards ==
In 1999, he was appointed an honorary professor at the University of Marburg.
