= Lichtenmoor Strangler =

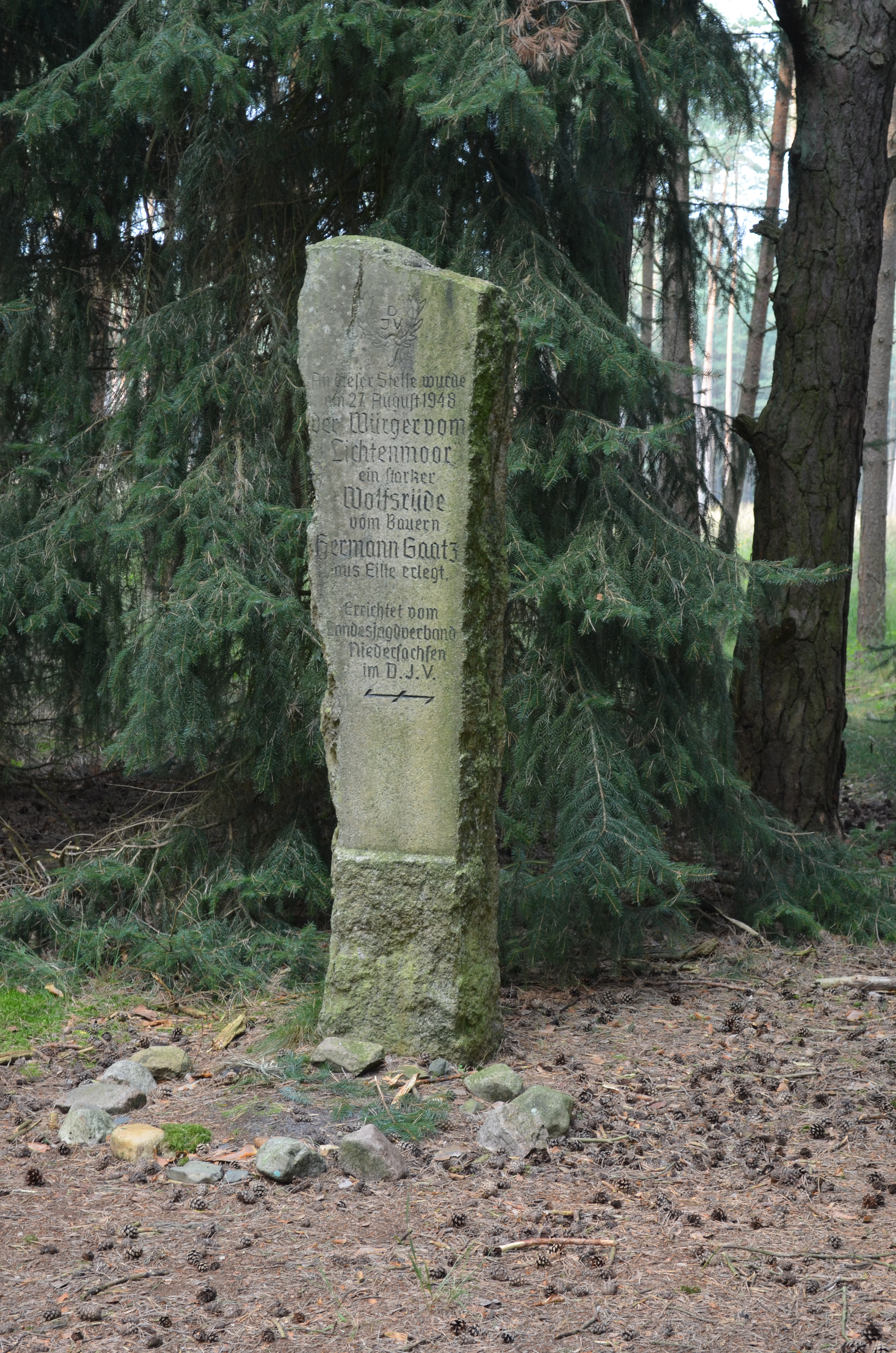
The wolf stone close to Ahlden. At this location a wolf was shot, that became known as the Lichtenmoor Strangler.

The Lichtenmoor Strangler (German: Würger vom Lichtenmoor) (1947/1948) was initially thought to be an unknown predator killing livestock. It is said to have killed numerous domestic and wild animals around the Lichtenmoor area, north-east of Nienburg/Weser in Lower Saxony, then in the British occupation zone in Germany.

The search for the killer and speculation about what animal it might be were fanned by rapidly growing media interest. It spread throughout Germany and led to large-scale but unsuccessful hunts. A wolf shot by a hunter in August 1948 revitalised the story which had died down.

Reports on the number of animals killed, the wounds and other evidence make it clear that the vast majority of cases involved poaching and illegal slaughter. This was not uncommon in the post-war period because there was a shortage of meat and food was rationed. The number of cases attributed to the strangler fell sharply after the currency reform on 21 June 1948 (introducing the Deutsche Mark). After the currency reform, food was much easier to obtain.

== First reports ==
The hunting ground attributed to the "strangler" was an area of around 30 square kilometres in the districts of Neustadt, Fallingbostel and Nienburg, centred on the sparsely populated Lichtenmoor. In the winter of 1947/48, numerous wild animals were killed there, and a "large, grey dog" was sighted, which was later linked to the wolf. When the grazing animals were driven out into the open in spring, an unknown hunter killed the first sheep and cattle.

Several of the cattle that were killed had the same unusual pattern of injuries: the right hind leg was torn open, causing the animal to bleed to death. The edges of the wounds were unusually smooth, more like they had been cut with a knife than torn open by a predator. Some of the sheep had even had their coats completely cut off in the pasture, which clearly pointed to a human hand.

== Climax and hysteria ==
In May 1948, a wider public began to become aware of the increasing losses of livestock. There were fruitless driven hunts, for which German hunters, disarmed in 1945, were equipped with rifles by the British military administration. On 15 June, the largest driven hunt ever seen in Lower Saxony took place, just as unsuccessfully. It involved 1500 beaters and 70 hunters, including members of the British military.

At first, it was assumed that poaching dogs were the culprit. However, the theory that it was a wolf was soon discussed. Other, more exotic suspects included lions, pumas and even a werewolf. Fear developed among the rural population in many places, which was further fuelled by media reports about the Strangler of Lichtenmoor. In July and August, the number of herd animals killed decreased significantly, as did the number of rumours and reports about the "strangler".

== Wolf theory ==
On 27 August 1948, when the number of animal losses attributed to the "strangler" had already fallen sharply, 61-year-old farmer Hermann Gaatz from Eilte shot a wolf from a tree stand in Schotenheide, which was stalking some deer. The following day he found the animal, a six-year-old male measuring 1.70 metres in length, 85 centimetres at the shoulder and weighing 95 pounds.

Gaatz wanted to have the dead wolf taxidermised and donate it to the Hanover State Museum. However, two strangers posed as official representatives and took the carcass to an unknown destination. Two days later, it turned up in the boot of a reporter's car in the car park of the Anzeiger (a local newspaper) high-rise in Hanover). In the hot summer weather, the carcass had already deteriorated to such an extent that it could no longer be prepared.

A reconstruction of the wolf's head, which was made from a plaster cast, is on display in the Hanover State Museum. The Lower Saxony Hunting Association had a "wolf stone" erected at the spot where the wolf was killed as a memorial.

== Modern assessment ==
Christiane Schilling created an exhibition of the Hanover State Museum in 2019. According to her, the wolf hype of the time had been created by sensationalist media reports. In Germany, the wolf was already wiped out around 1850.

Today, a large proportion of the domestic and wild animal killings of the 1940s are blamed on people who wanted to circumvent the food controls imposed by the British and German authorities. This was possible because the animals officially killed by the "strangler" were not allowed to be processed into food and were therefore not covered by the corresponding controls. This meant that the meat could be utilised illegally and sold on the black market. In that time, meat was rationed by the authorities; a citizen was allowed only 100 g of meat a month. Poaching was difficult because of the restriction of gun use.

This suspicion is supported not only by the cuts on the animals found, but also by the number of animals killed, which would be unrealistic for a single wolf: 58 cattle, according to other sources 65, are recorded for the summer of 1948 alone. The highest numbers were in May and June. In addition, around one hundred sheep and numerous wild animals were killed.

On 21 June 1948, a currency reform introduced the new D-Mark in the Western zones of occupation in Germany. Soon after, a market economy started to function again. The number of animals killed fell rapidly.

== Art ==
Der Würger vom Lichtenmoor is a local history book written by Hans Stuhlmacher in 1949. Today, the book is mainly read in schools in Lower Saxony as a non-fiction book about the local area.
