= Leese, Germany =

Leese
- Municipality
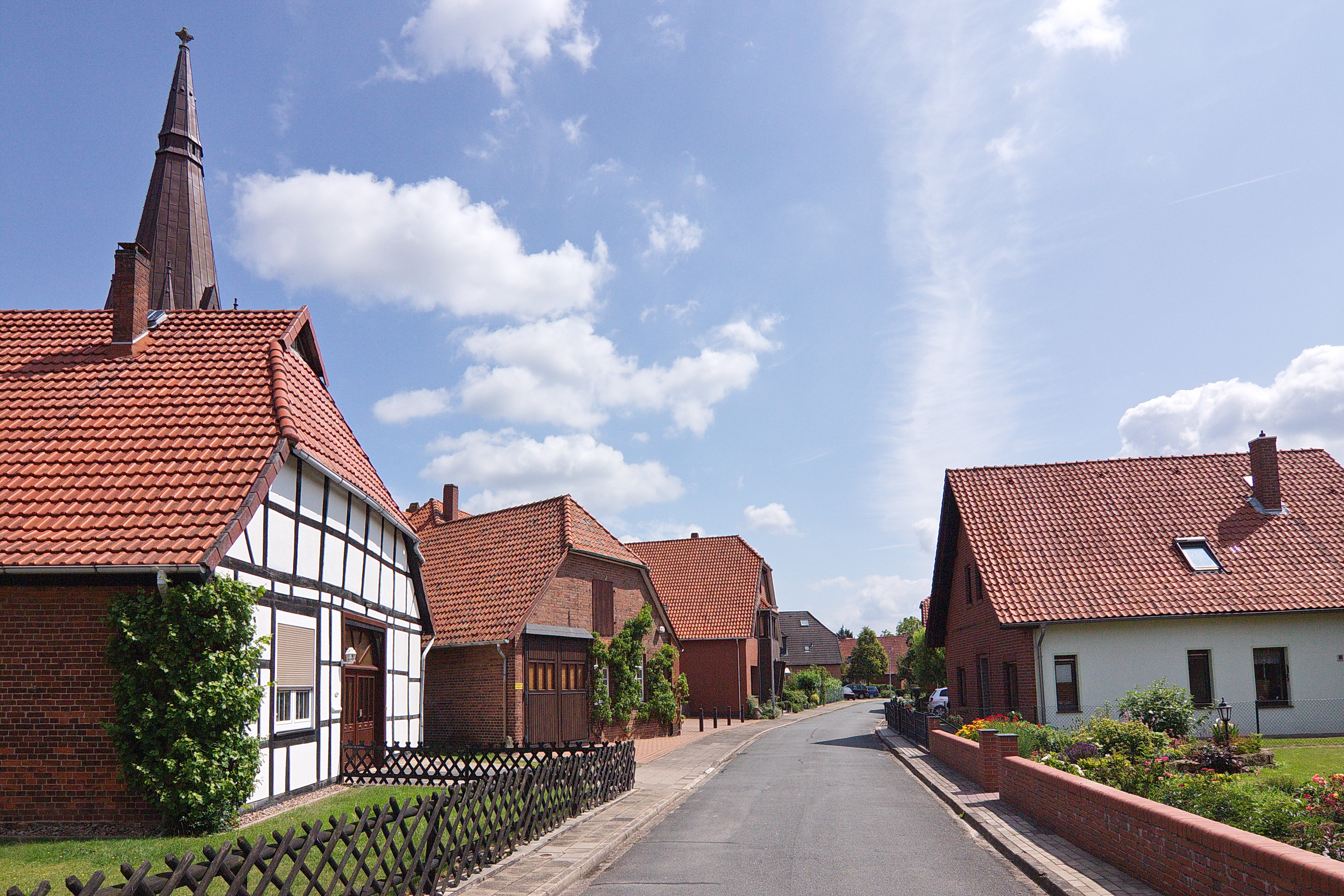

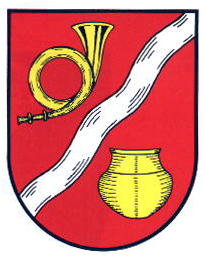
- Coat of arms

- Location of Leese within Nienburg district
- Interactive map of Leese
- Location within Germany Location within Lower Saxony
- Coordinates: 52°30′N 09°07′E
- Country: Germany
- State: Lower Saxony
- District: Nienburg
- Municipal assoc.: Mittelweser

Government
  - Mayor: Henning Olthage (SPD)

Area
  - Total: 29.77 km^{2} (11.49 sq mi)
- Elevation: 34 m (112 ft)

Population (2025-12-31)
  - Total: 1,612
  - Density: 54.15/km^{2} (140.2/sq mi)
- Time zone: UTC+01:00 (CET)
  - Summer (DST): UTC+02:00 (CEST)
- Postal codes: 31633
- Dialling codes: 05761
- Vehicle registration: NI
- Website: www.leese.de

Leese (German pronunciation: [ˈleːzə]) is a municipality in the district of Nienburg, in Lower Saxony, Germany.

== History ==
Leese was one of the earliest settlements in the Middle Weser Region. Around 20 tumulus graves have been found, the oldest dating back to about 1800 BCE. The urnfield graves in the so-called "small field" of Leese were excavated under the auspices of the Landesamt für Denkmalpflege (Lower Saxony Bureau for Cultural Heritage) between 1978 and 1980 turned out to be the largest graveyard of urn burials in the pre-Roman Iron Age of northern Germany, with 1100 burials. An urn is represented in the lower part of the town's coat of arms. At the time of the early Roman Empire, the area was occupied by the German tribe of Angrivarii, to the south of the Cherusci.
