= Ernst Thoms =

German painter

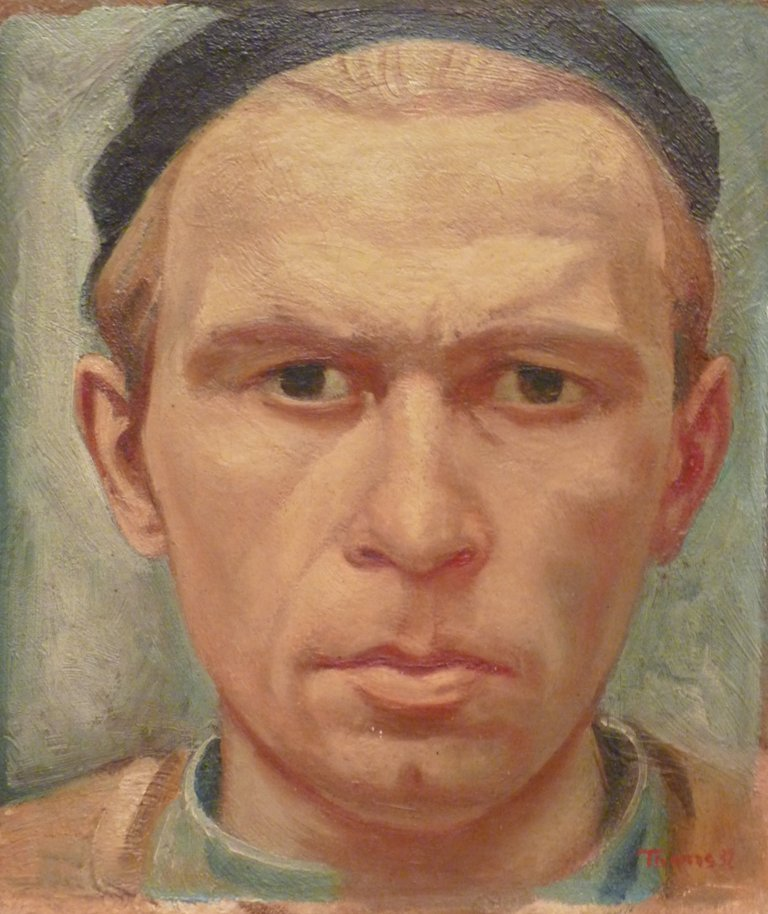
Self-portrait of Ernst Thoms (1932)

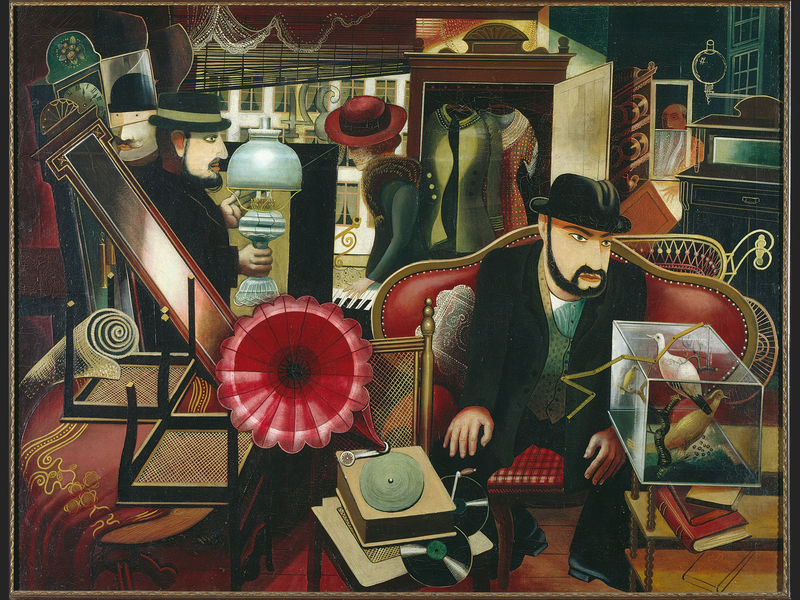
Junk Shop (1926)

Ernst Thoms (November 13, 1896 – May 11, 1983) was a German painter associated with the New Objectivity.

Thoms was born in Nienburg. He apprenticed as a painter from 1911 to 1914. At the start of World War I in 1914, he entered military service. He was captured as a prisoner of war and held in England for five years ending in 1919. In 1920, Thoms studied under Fritz Burger-Mühlfeld at the School of Arts and Crafts in Hanover. He found work as a stage-set painter at the Opera House in Hanover during 1924–25.

Like the other New Objectivity artists active in Hanover, Thoms worked in a style that was unsentimental but "often reveals moods of a lyrical and fairy-tale-like nature", according to Sergiusz Michalski. In Attic (1926), Thoms presents prosaic subject matter in an undramatic way that nevertheless, with its openings into glimpsed spaces, suggests a mystery.

Among the Hanover New Objectivity artists, Thoms was the only one who received any support from the Kestner-Society, which gave him a solo exhibition in 1926. He was also the only one who gained exposure in Berlin, where he had a solo show in 1928 in the Galerie Neumann-Nierendorf. He joined the Hanover Secession in 1931.

Thoms was in military service during 1939–40. In 1943, Allied bombing destroyed his house and studio, causing a loss of many of his works. He was given a retrospective at the Hanover Kunstverein in 1957, and in 1964 was awarded the Grand Cross of Merit of the Lower-Saxony Order of Merit.

Thoms died in Wietzen in 1983.

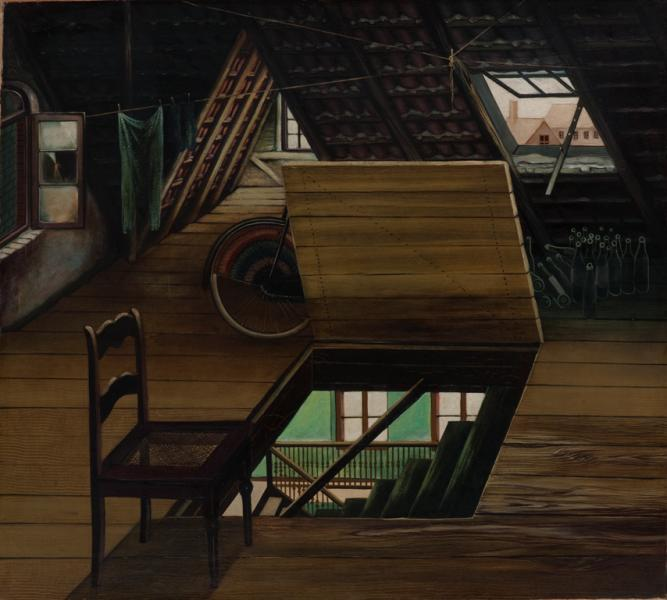
Attic (1926)

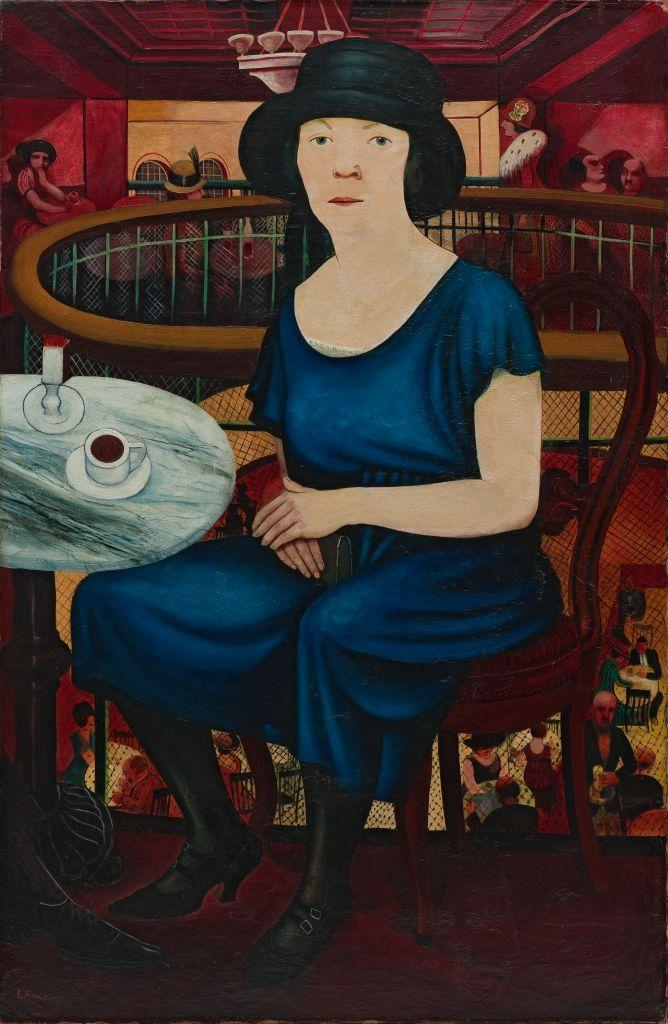
In the Café (1927)

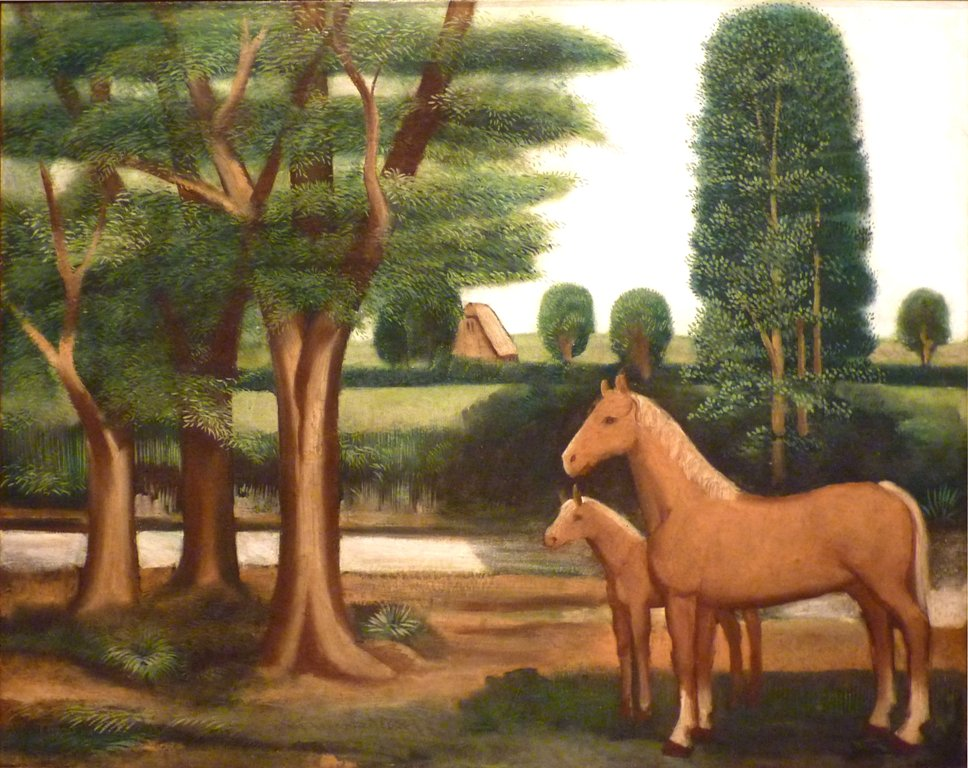
Horses and Trees (1928)
