= Eric V of Hoya =

Count of Hoya

Eric V, Count of Hoya
- Born: 1535
- Died: 12 March 1575
- Noble family: House of Hoya
- Spouse: Armgard, Countess of Rietberg
- Father: Jobst II, Count of Hoya
- Mother: Anna of Gleichen

Eric V of Hoya (1535 – 12 March 1575) was from 1563 to 1575 Count of Hoya.

== Life ==
Eric was the son of Jobst II of Hoya and Anna of Gleichen. As a younger son, Eric was initially destined for an ecclesiastical career. He was a canon of Bremen, Cologne and Strasbourg. After his older brother Albert II had died childless in 1563, Eric ruled the county of Hoya jointly with his younger brother Otto VIII.

After introducing the Reformation in his territories, he issued in 1573 a Lutheran Church Order for his counties Hoya, Rietberg and Bruchhausen and the Lordships of Esens, Stedesdorf and Wittmund.

== Marriage ==
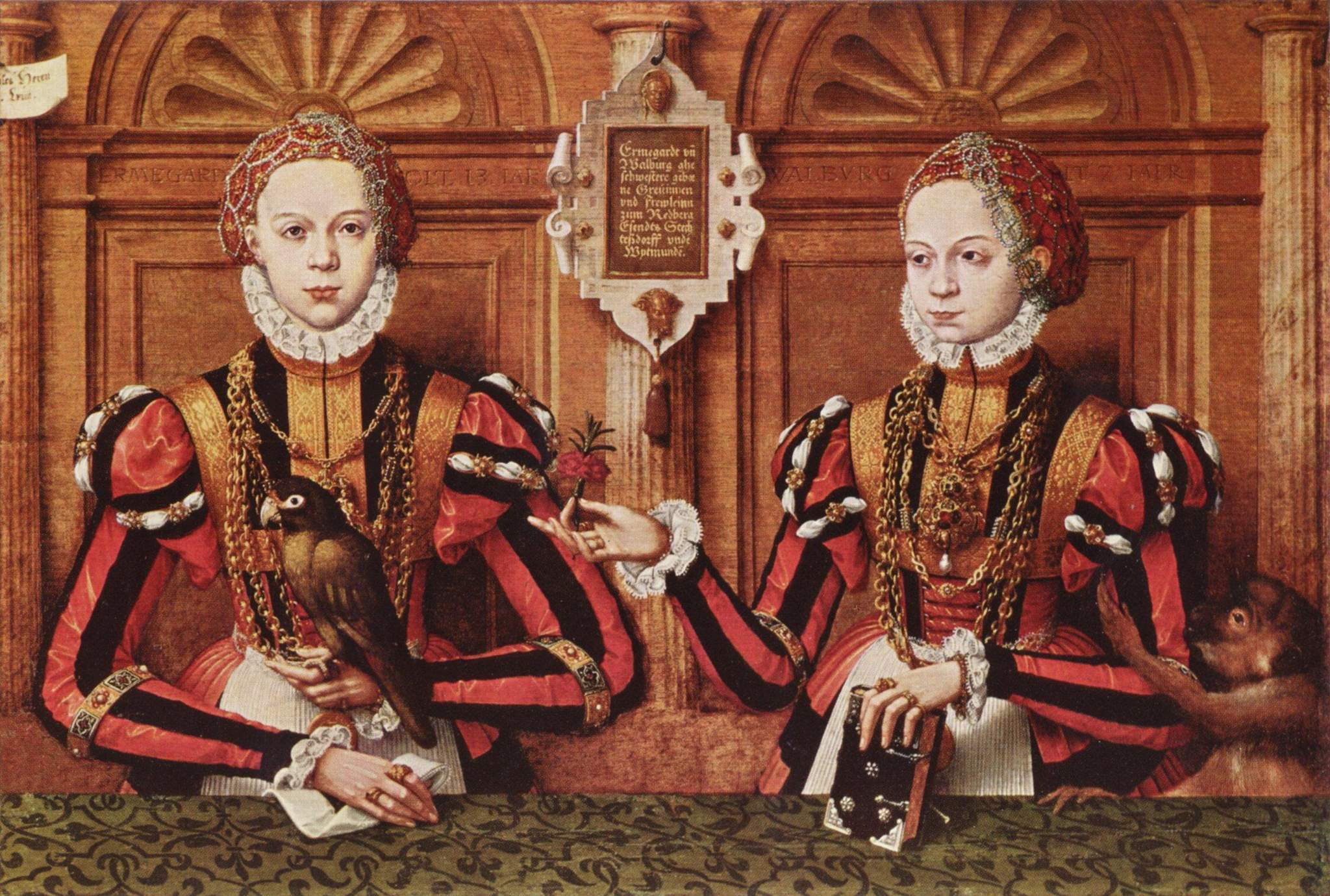
Eric's wife Armgard (left) and her sister Walburgis of Rietberg, detail of a family portrait by Hermann tom Ring

In 1568, Eric married Countess Armgard of Rietberg. At the same time, his brother Otto VIII married Armgard's mother, Agnes of Rietberg (born in Bentheim-Steinfurt). He took up the regency of the Harlingerland for his wife and her underage sister Walburgis. The sisters had inherited Harlingerland from their father, Count John II.

Eric's marriage remained childless. After Eric's death Armgard married Count Simon VI of Lippe. The county of Rietberg and the Harlingerland fell to Walburgis. His brother Otto took up the government of Hoya. Otto was the last Count of Hoya; he died childless in 1582.
