= Landesbergen =

- Municipality
- Coat of arms

- Location of Landesbergen within Nienburg/Weser district
- Interactive map of Landesbergen
- Location within Germany Location within Lower Saxony
- Coordinates: 52°34′N 09°08′E
- Country: Germany
- State: Lower Saxony
- District: Nienburg/Weser
- Municipal assoc.: Mittelweser
- Subdivisions: 4

Government
  - Mayor: Walter Busse (CDU)

Area
  - Total: 41.92 km^{2} (16.19 sq mi)
- Elevation: 29 m (95 ft)

Population (2025-12-31)
  - Total: 2,833
  - Density: 67.58/km^{2} (175.0/sq mi)
- Time zone: UTC+01:00 (CET)
  - Summer (DST): UTC+02:00 (CEST)
- Postal codes: 31628
- Dialling codes: 05025
- Vehicle registration: NI
- Website: www.landesbergen.de

Landesbergen is a municipality in the district of Nienburg, in Lower Saxony, Germany. It is situated on the right bank of the Weser, approx. 10 km southwest of Nienburg, and 35 km northeast of Minden.

Landesbergen was the seat of the former Samtgemeinde ("collective municipality") Landesbergen.
