= Estorf =

- Municipality
- Coat of arms

- Location of Estorf within Nienburg/Weser district
- Interactive map of Estorf
- Location within Germany Location within Lower Saxony
- Coordinates: 52°35′27″N 9°8′25″E
- Country: Germany
- State: Lower Saxony
- District: Nienburg/Weser
- Municipal assoc.: Mittelweser
- Subdivisions: 3

Government
  - Mayor: Jens Lange (SPD)

Area
  - Total: 19.78 km^{2} (7.64 sq mi)
- Elevation: 31 m (102 ft)

Population (2025-12-31)
  - Total: 1,710
  - Density: 86.5/km^{2} (224/sq mi)
- Time zone: UTC+01:00 (CET)
  - Summer (DST): UTC+02:00 (CEST)
- Postal codes: 31629
- Dialling codes: 05025
- Vehicle registration: NI
- Website: www.estorf.de

Estorf is a municipality in the district of Nienburg, in Lower Saxony, Germany. Within its borders lie the villages of Estorf, Leeseringen, and Nienburger Bruch.

== History ==
The village was first mentioned in a document dated February 9, 1096. Archaeological finds have led to the conclusion that there has been a permanent human settlement since 550 AD.

During the Thirty Years' War (1618-1648), the residents of Estorf built barns hidden in a nearby forest to hide and protect their harvest from marauding soldiers. Some of these barns can still be visited today.

== Landmarks ==
- Baroque church from 1696 de:Kirche Estorf (Weser)

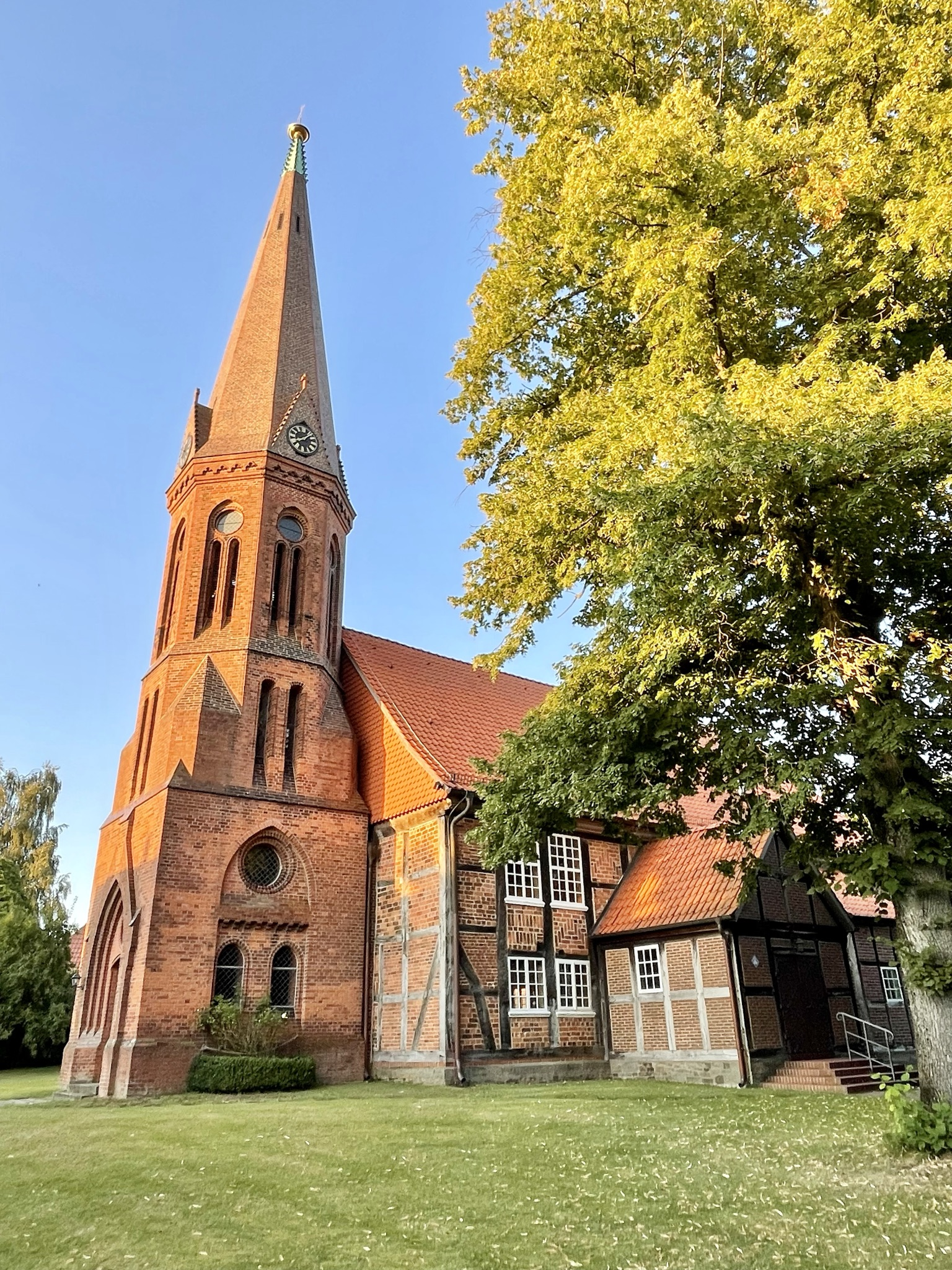
Estorfer church
