= Mittelweser (Samtgemeinde) =

Samtgemeinde in Lower Saxony

- Samtgemeinde
- Location of Mittelweser within Nienburg district
- Interactive map of Mittelweser
- Location within Germany Location within Lower Saxony
- Coordinates: 52°32′N 9°07′E
- Country: Germany
- State: Lower Saxony
- District: Nienburg
- Seat: Stolzenau
- Subdivisions: 5 municipalities

Area
  - Total: 196.56 km^{2} (75.89 sq mi)

Population (2025-12-31)
  - Total: 15,497
  - Density: 78.841/km^{2} (204.20/sq mi)
- Time zone: UTC+01:00 (CET)
  - Summer (DST): UTC+02:00 (CEST)
- Website: www.sg-mittelweser.de

Mittelweser is a Samtgemeinde ("collective municipality") in the district of Nienburg, in Lower Saxony, Germany. Its seat is in the village Stolzenau. It was formed on 1 November 2011 when the municipality Stolzenau joined the former Samtgemeinde Landesbergen.

As of 2025, the collective municipality has approximately 16,000 residents.

The Samtgemeinde Mittelweser consists of the following municipalities:

1. Estorf
2. Husum
3. Landesbergen
4. Leese
5. Stolzenau

== Recent developments ==
In June 2025, Die Harke reported that trees across Samtgemeinde Mittelweser have been infested with toxic caterpillars.
