= Husum, Lower Saxony =

Husum
- Municipality
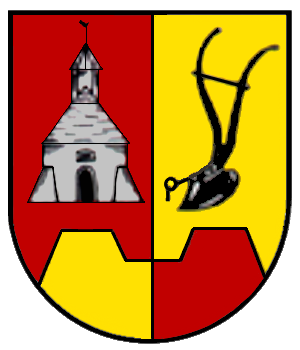
- Coat of arms

- Location of Husum within Nienburg/Weser district
- Interactive map of Husum
- Location within Germany Location within Lower Saxony
- Coordinates: 52°34′N 09°15′E
- Country: Germany
- State: Lower Saxony
- District: Nienburg/Weser
- Municipal assoc.: Mittelweser
- Subdivisions: 4

Government
  - Mayor: Friedrich Fischer (CDU)

Area
  - Total: 40.01 km^{2} (15.45 sq mi)
- Elevation: 44 m (144 ft)

Population (2025-12-31)
  - Total: 2,315
  - Density: 57.86/km^{2} (149.9/sq mi)
- Time zone: UTC+01:00 (CET)
  - Summer (DST): UTC+02:00 (CEST)
- Postal codes: 31632
- Dialling codes: 05027
- Vehicle registration: NI

Husum (German pronunciation: [ˈhuːzʊm]) is a municipality in the district of Nienburg, in Lower Saxony, Germany.
