= Eric I of Hoya =

Count of Upper Hoya (1370–1426)

Eric I, Count of Hoya
- Born: 1370
- Died: 1426 (aged 55–56)
- Noble family: House of Hoya
- Spouse: Helen of Brunswick-Lüneburg
- Issue Detail: John V, Count of Hoya
- Father: John II, Count of Hoya
- Mother: Helen of Saxe-Lauenburg

Eric I, Count of Hoya (1370–1426) was a German nobleman. He was the ruling Count of Upper Hoya from 1377 until his death.

== Life ==
Eric was the son of Count John II and his wife Helen, a daughter of Duke Eric I of Saxe-Lauenburg. His brother, John was Bishop of Paderborn from 1394 to 1399 and Bishop of Hildesheim from 1399 to 1424. His brother Otto was Bishop of Münster from 1392 to 1424, and from 1410 to 1424 also administrator of Osnabrück

Eric inherited Upper Hoya in 1377. He expanded the county to the south, at the expense of the Bishopric of Minden. In 1383, he built a castle at Diepenau. Bishop Wittekind II of Minden destroyed this castle a short time later. He also destroyed the village of Uchte and its castle. Eric retaliated by destroying Fischer, a suburb of Minden. He reconquered Diepenau and Uchte and rebuilt the castles.

He expanded the county further by purchasing manors.

== Marriage and issue ==
In 1390, Eric married Helen, a daughter of Duke Magnus II Torquatus of Brunswick-Lüneburg. The marriage produced six children:

- John V (d. 1466), succeeded his father as Count of Upper Hoya
- Albert (d. 1470), Bishop of Minden
- Otto (d. 1440), provost of St. Mary's Cathedral in Hamburg and administrator of the Archbishopric of Bremen
- Eric (d. 1458), provost of Cologne and administrator of the Bishopric of Osnabrück
- Helene (d. 1426), married Count Adolph VIII of Schauenburg and Holstein-Pinneberg
- Ermengard, married Count Otto VII of Tecklenburg
