= Steyerberg =

- Municipality
- Location of Steyerberg within Nienburg district
- Interactive map of Steyerberg
- Location within Germany Location within Lower Saxony
- Coordinates: 52°34′13″N 09°01′25″E
- Country: Germany
- State: Lower Saxony
- District: Nienburg
- Subdivisions: 8 districts

Government
  - Mayor (2021–26): Marcus Meyer (Ind.)

Area
  - Total: 101.92 km^{2} (39.35 sq mi)
- Elevation: 27 m (89 ft)

Population (2025-12-31)
  - Total: 5,140
  - Density: 50.4/km^{2} (131/sq mi)
- Time zone: UTC+01:00 (CET)
  - Summer (DST): UTC+02:00 (CEST)
- Postal codes: 31595
- Dialling codes: 05764
- Vehicle registration: NI
- Website: www.steyerberg.de

Steyerberg is a municipality in the district of Nienburg, in Lower Saxony, Germany. It is situated approximately 15 km southwest of Nienburg, and 30 km north of Minden.
