= County of Hoya =

State of the Holy Roman Empire

County of Hoya Grafschaft Hoya (German)
- 1202–1582
- Coat of arms

- County of Hoya (in red) about 1400
- Status: County
- Capital: Hoya; Nienburg
- Historical era: Middle Ages
  - Henry I Count of Hoya: 1202
  - Partitioned between Hoya and Nienburg: 1345
  - Reunited under Jobst I of Nienburg: 1497
  - Joined Lower Rhenish–West- phalian Circle: 1500
  - Count Jobst II turned Protestant: 1523
  - Death of Otto VIII: 1582
  - Part of Prussia: 1866
| Preceded by | Succeeded by |
| Duchy of Saxony | Brunswick-Lüneburg |
- Today part of: Germany

The County of Hoya (German: Grafschaft Hoya) was a state of the Holy Roman Empire, located in the present German state of Lower Saxony. It was centred on the town of Hoya on the middle Weser river, between Bremen and Nienburg; the area now belongs to the districts of Nienburg and Diepholz. The largest city in the county was Nienburg. The county was absorbed into the Duchy of Brunswick-Luneburg in 1582.

== Geography ==
As of 1582, Hoya was bordered by (from the north, clockwise): The City of Bremen, the Archbishopric of Bremen, the Bishopric of Verden, the Lüneburg and Calenberg subdivisions of Brunswick-Lüneburg, the Bishopric of Minden, the County of Diepholz, the Bishopric of Münster, and the County of Oldenburg.

== History ==
A first Count Henry (Heinrich) at Hoya in Saxony appeared as a vassal of Archbishop Hartwig II of Bremen in 1202. He had disputes with the local Hodenberg noble family at Hodenhagen Castle over their estates on the Weser which were gradually acquired by Count Henry and his descendants until 1313. The Province of Nienburg was acquired in 1215. The acquisition of Nienburg led to a long-term conflict with the Bishops of Minden who baulked at the expansionism of their comital neighbours.

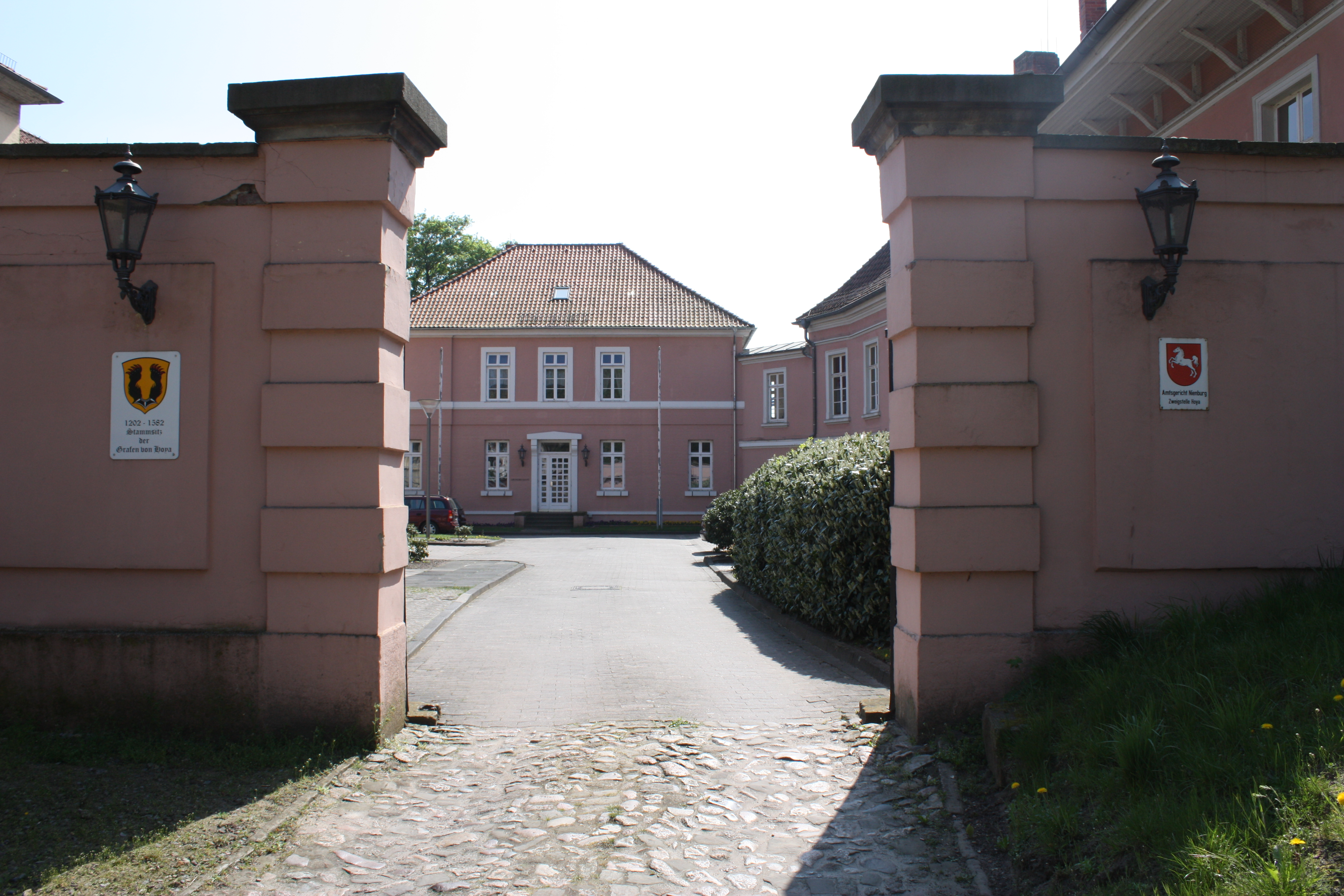
Hoya Castle

In 1345 the brothers Gerhard III and John II of Hoya, divided the county among themselves. When the elder branch of the Gerhard line at Hoya became extinct in 1497, the territories were re-unified under John's descendant Count Jobst I residing at Nienburg. In 1450 the family became embroiled in the Münster Diocesan Feud, but failed in their attempt to install Erich of Hoya as the Bishop of Münster. In the 16th century, the counts came under pressure from the mighty Dukes of Brunswick-Lüneburg, who in 1512 occupied their estates.

Hoya-Bruchhausen

The county was partitioned after Otto VIII, Count of Hoya died without sons in 1582. The majority of the territory was received by the Calenberg line with the remainder to the Lüneburg line of the Duchy of Brunswick-Lüneburg and the Landgraviate of Hesse-Cassel. The Counts of Hoya already had to recognize the Welf dukes of Brunswick-Lüneburg as liege lords in 1512.

After the Austro-Prussian War of 1866, the area together with the Kingdom of Hanover was annexed by Prussia.

== Counts of Hoya ==
- Henry I 1202-1235
- Henry II 1235-1290
- Gerhard II 1290-1313
- Otto II 1313-1324
- Gerhard III 1324-1345 jointly with his brother
  - John II

=== Hoya-Hoya ===
- Gerhard III 1345-1383
- Otto III 1383-1428
- Otto V 1428-1451
- Otto VII 1451-1497

=== Hoya-Nienburg ===
- John II 1345-1377
- Eric I 1377-1426
- John V 1426-1466
- Jobst I 1466-1497

=== Reunited ===
- Jobst I 1497-1507
- Jobst II 1507-1545
- Albert II 1545-1563
- Eric V 1563-1575
- Otto VIII 1575-1582
