= Stolzenau =

- Municipality
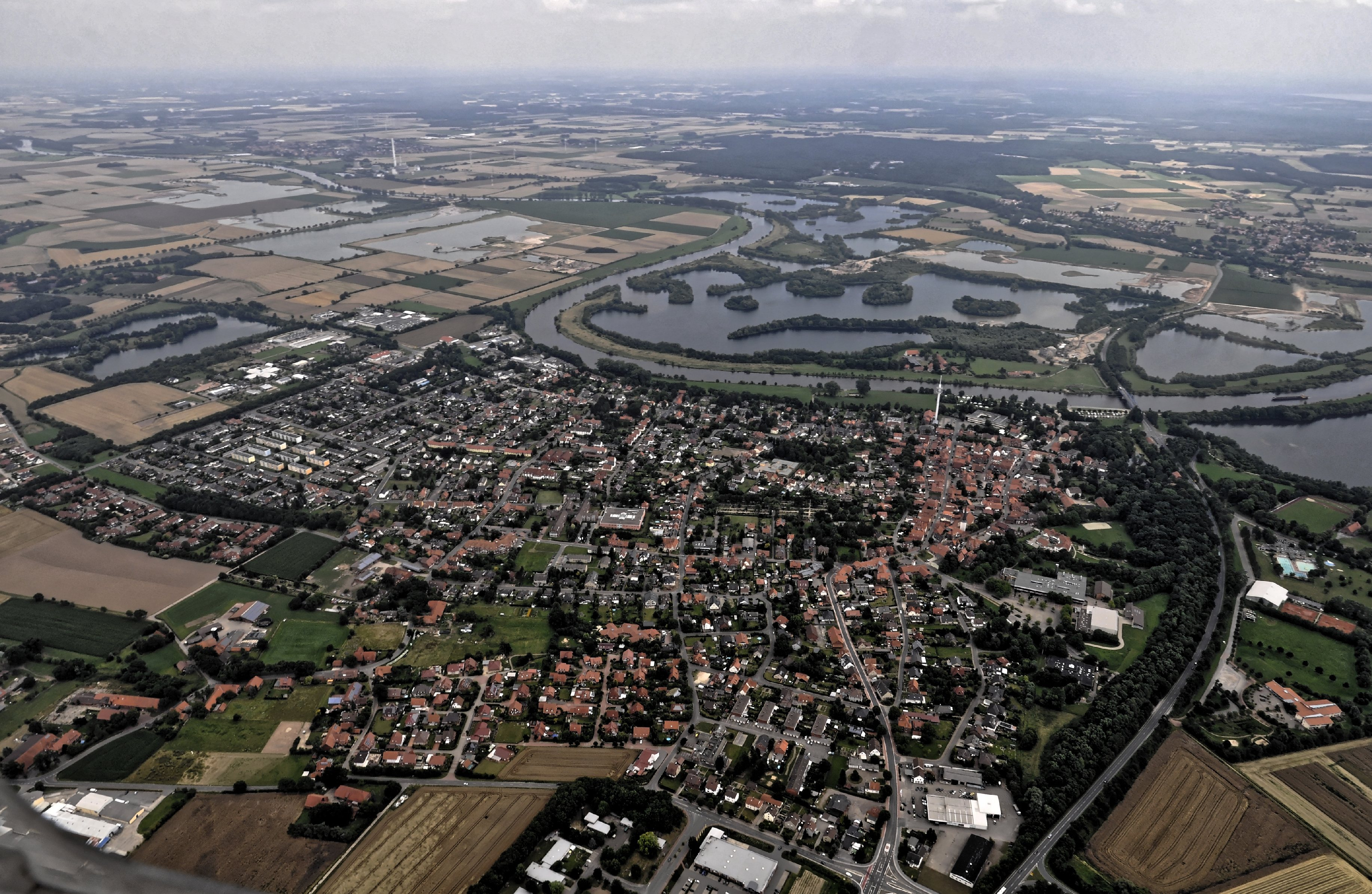
- Aerial view

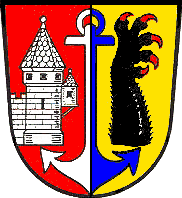
- Coat of arms

- Location of Stolzenau within Nienburg/Weser district
- Interactive map of Stolzenau
- Location within Germany Location within Lower Saxony
- Coordinates: 52°31′N 9°4′E
- Country: Germany
- State: Lower Saxony
- District: Nienburg/Weser
- Municipal assoc.: Mittelweser
- Subdivisions: 9 districts

Government
  - Mayor: Heinrich Kruse

Area
  - Total: 65 km^{2} (25 sq mi)
- Elevation: 29 m (95 ft)

Population (2025-12-31)
  - Total: 7,027
  - Density: 110/km^{2} (280/sq mi)
- Time zone: UTC+01:00 (CET)
  - Summer (DST): UTC+02:00 (CEST)
- Postal codes: 31592
- Dialling codes: 05761
- Vehicle registration: NI
- Website: www.stolzenau.de

Stolzenau is a municipality in the district of Nienburg, in Lower Saxony, Germany. It is situated on the left bank of the Weser, approx. 20 km southwest of Nienburg, and 25 km northeast of Minden. During the second half of the 20th century, a unit of the Royal Netherlands Air Force was stationed in Stolzenau.
