= Nienburg, Lower Saxony =

Nienburg
- Town
- Coat of arms

- Location of Nienburg within Nienburg district
- Interactive map of Nienburg
- Location within Germany Location within Lower Saxony
- Coordinates: 52°38′28″N 9°12′25″E
- Country: Germany
- State: Lower Saxony
- District: Nienburg
- Subdivisions: 4 districts

Government
  - Mayor (2021–26): Jan Wendorf (Ind.)

Area
  - Total: 64.53 km^{2} (24.92 sq mi)
- Elevation: 25 m (82 ft)

Population (2025-12-31)
  - Total: 32,644
  - Density: 505.9/km^{2} (1,310/sq mi)
- Time zone: UTC+01:00 (CET)
  - Summer (DST): UTC+02:00 (CEST)
- Postal codes: 31582
- Dialling codes: 05021
- Vehicle registration: NI
- Website: Nienburg.de

Nienburg (German: [ˈniːnˌbʊʁk], official name: Nienburg/Weser; Low German: Nienborg, Neenborg or Negenborg), is a town and capital of the district of Nienburg in Lower Saxony, Germany.

== Geography ==
Situated on the scenic German Timber-Frame Road, Nienburg lies on the River Weser, approximately 55 km (34 mi) south-east of Bremen and 45 km (28 mi) north-west of Hanover. Nienburg is the largest town in the Middle Weser Region.

== Demography ==
Year	1987	1992	1997	1998	1999	2000	2001	2002	2003	2004	2005	2006	2007	2008	2009	2010	2011
Population	29,427	31,444	32,837	32,789	32,659	32,611	32,454	32,462	32,543	32,691	32,803	32,764	32,384	32,205	32,152	31,924	31,862

(as of Dec. 31st)

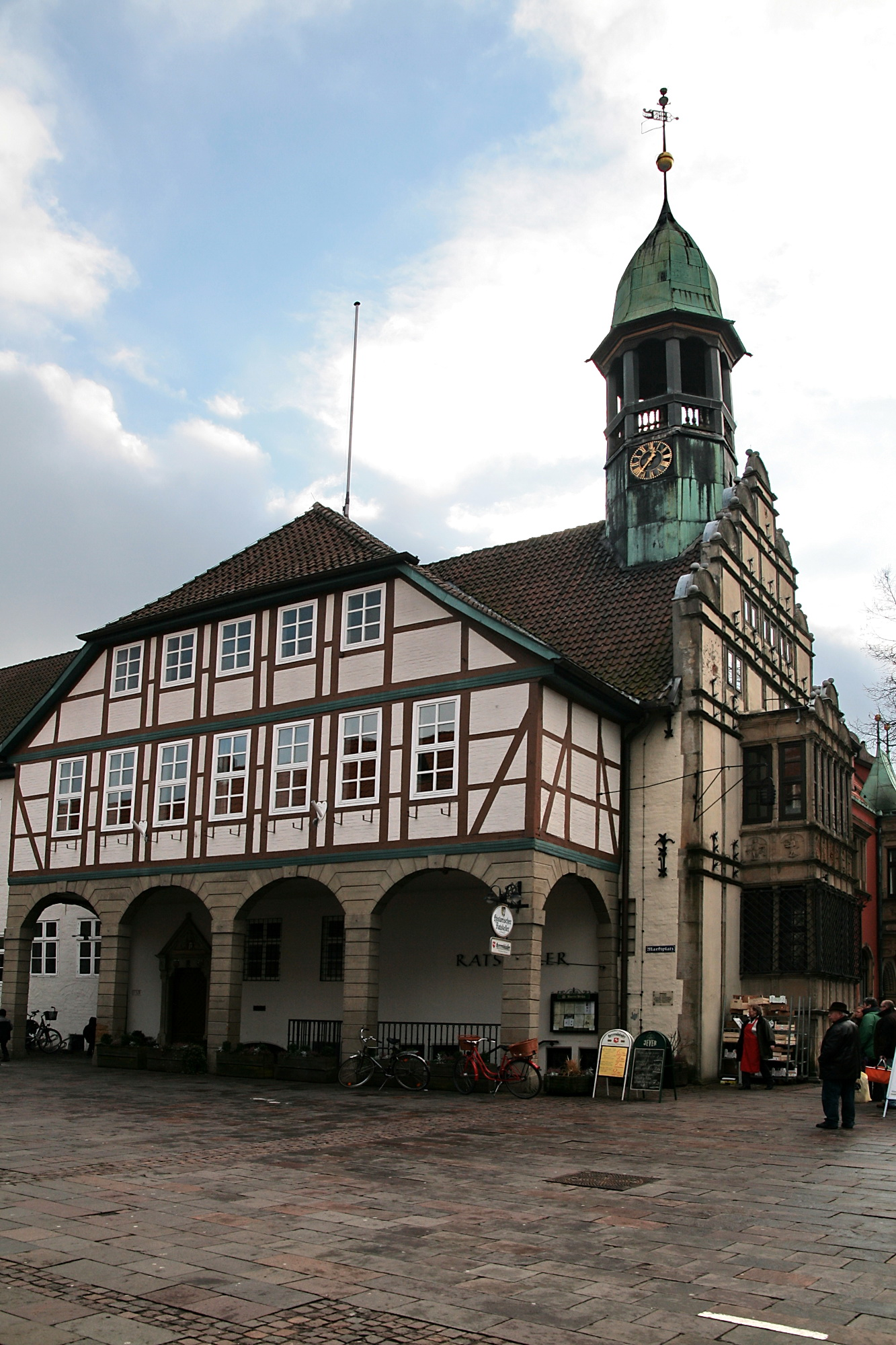
Town hall

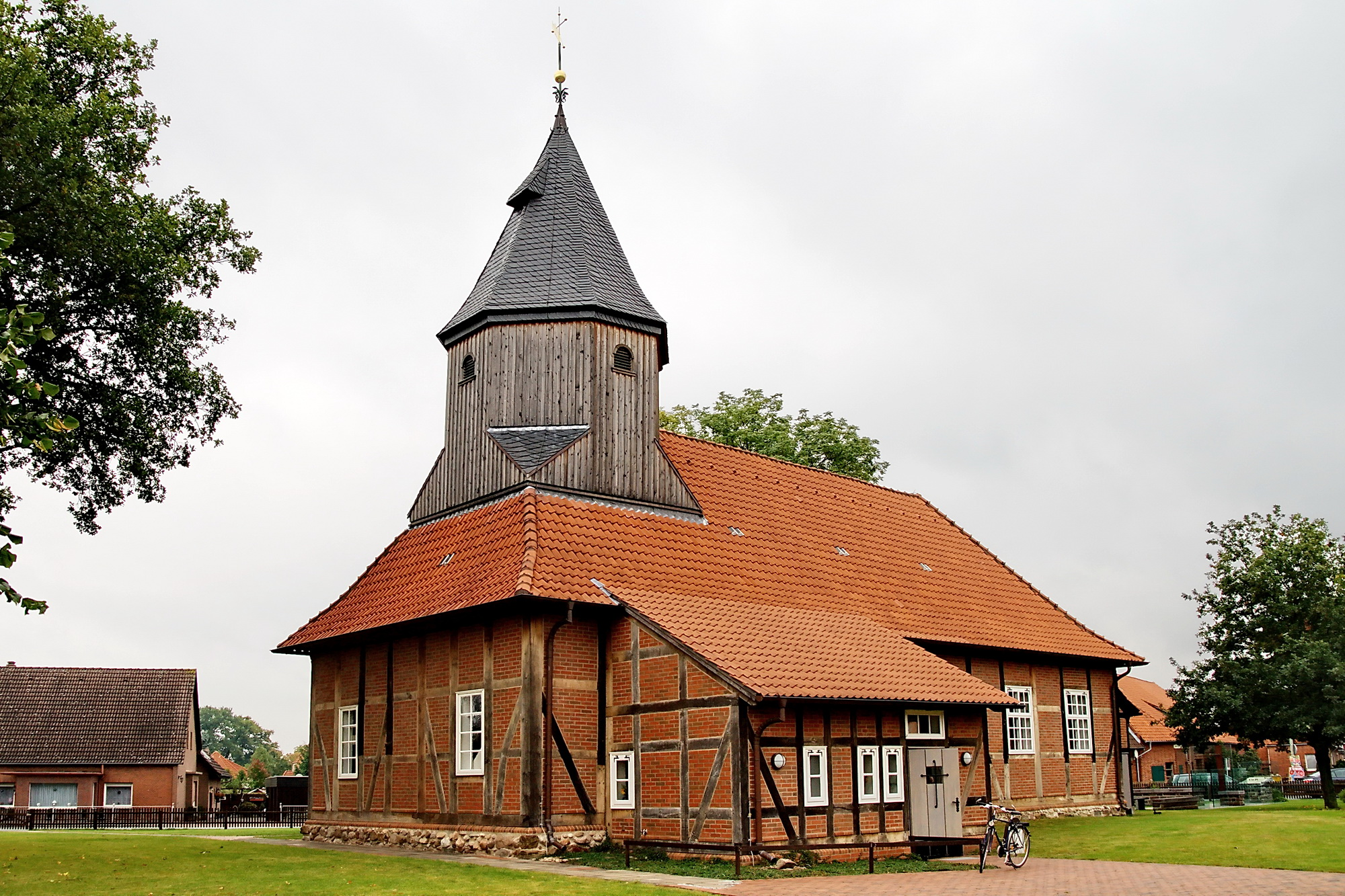
Corvinus-Church Erichshagen-Wölpe

=== Structure ===
Nienburg, including quarters

- Erichshagen
- Holtorf
- Langendamm
- Schäferhof/Kattriede
- Nordertor
- Leintor
- Lehmwandlung
- Alpheide

== History ==
The major reason for the emergence and development of Nienburg into the largest city in the Middle Weser region was its location at a convenient ford in the Weser River, leading to multiple trade routes radiating from the location. As early as 1025 the location was referred to as Negenborg, i.e. New Castle. In 1215 it began to be referred to as a city, a civitas, when Count Henry I of Hoya began the residence of his ruling line. From 1582 until 1866 the Guelph (Welf) Dukes of Brunswick-Lüneburg controlled the county, except for Napoleonic French rule from 1803 to 1813. In 1871, it became part of the German Empire.

During World War II, it was the location of German prisoner-of-war camps Oflag X-B and Stalag X-C, in which French, Polish, Belgian, Romanian, Serbian, Italian and Soviet POWs were held.

In the wake of the war, a large number of livestock was killed in the region by an unknown predator, called Lichtenmoor Strangler.

The former County of Wölpe was the seat of the Grafen (counts) von Wölpe with its associated castle. The castle (Burg Wölpe) was destroyed in the Hildesheim Diocesan Feud in 1522.

== Politics ==
=== Mayor ===
Since the 2021 elections, the mayor is Jan Wendorf (independent). The previous mayor was Henning Onkes (independent). He was reelected in 2014 against three competitors.

=== Local council (Stadtrat) ===
The 38 members of the "Stadtrat" are divided among:

- CDU: 13, among them the second deputy mayor Wilhelm Schlemermeyer
- SPD:14, among them the first deputy mayor Rolf Warnecke
- Alliance 90/The Greens: 6, among them the third deputy mayor Hedda Freese
- FDP: 1
- Wählergemeinschaft - Independent Union of Citizens WG 3
- The Left (Germany): 1
- One additional vote by the elected mayor of Nienburg, Mr. Henning Onkes, who does not belong to any political party

The elections in September 2016 showed the following results:

- CDU: 13 seats
- SPD: 12 seats
- Alliance 90/The Greens: 5 seats
- Wählergruppe Nienburg: 3seats
- FDP: 2 seats
- THE LEFT: 2 seats
- ULN: 1 seat

== Twin towns – sister cities ==
Nienburg is twinned with:

- Bartoszyce, Poland
- Las Cruces, New Mexico, United States
- Nienburg, Saxony-Anhalt, Germany
- Vitebsk, Belarus

== Notable people ==
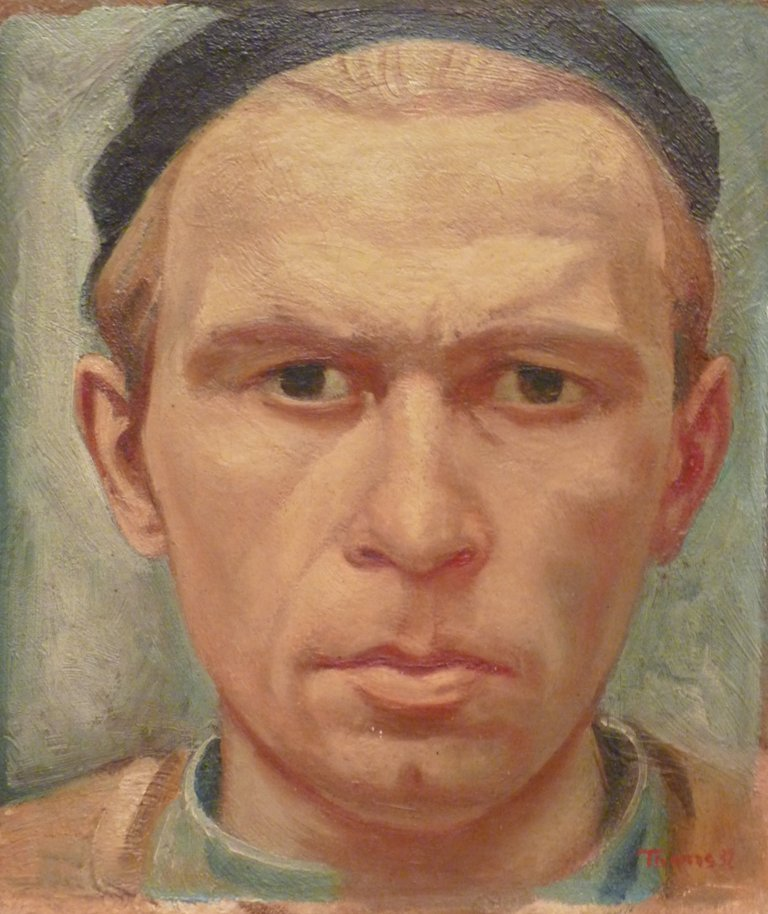
Ernst Thoms, self portrait, 1932

- Johann Georg Steigerthal (1666–1740), a court physician to George I of Great Britain in Hanover.
- Ernst Teichmann (1869–1919), theologian and zoologist, worked on the tsetse fly
- Heinrich Lübbe (1884–1940), engineer, worked for Dutch aircraft designer Anthony Fokker
- Kurt Matthaei (1886–1974), lawyer and a Nazi Party politician
- Ernst Thoms (1896–1983), a New Objectivity painter
- Oskar Gröning (1921–2018), SS Unterscharführer at the Auschwitz concentration camp
- Lutz Meyer-Gossner (born 1936), judge at the Federal Court from 1983 to 2001
- Angelika Neuwirth (born 1943), an Islamic studies scholar
- Susanne Schröter (born 1957), contemporary social Anthropologist
- Carsten Sieling (born 1959), politician, mayor and president of the senate of the Free Hanseatic City of Bremen (SPD)
- Maja Maranow (1961–2016), actress

=== Sport ===
- Volker Finke (born 1948), football coach
- Christine Traurig (born 1957), an American equestrian, bronze medallist in team dressage at the 2000 Summer Olympics
- Levent Ayçiçek (born 1994), footballer, played over 320 games

== See also ==
- Metropolitan region Hannover-Braunschweig-Göttingen-Wolfsburg
