= Hibernaculum (zoology) =

Wild animal shelter

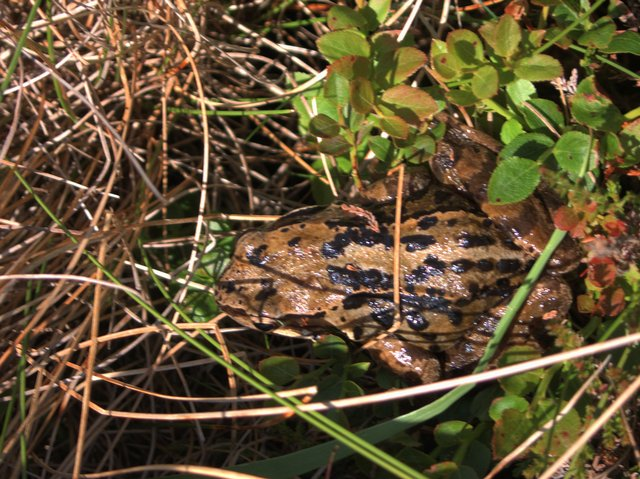
A common frog emerging from its hibernation under a clump of vegetation, which functions as its hibernaculum

A hibernaculum (plural form: hibernacula) (Latin, "tent for winter quarters") is a place in which an animal seeks refuge, such as a bear using a cave to overwinter. The word can be used to describe a variety of shelters used by many kinds of animals, including insects, toads, lizards, snakes, bats, rodents, and primates of various species.

== Insects ==
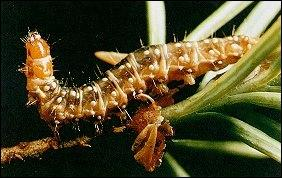
A western spruce budworm moves along a small branch.

Insects range in their size, structure, and general appearance but most use hibernacula. All insects are primarily ectothermic. For this reason, extremely cold temperatures, such as those experienced in the winter, outside of tropical locations, cause their metabolic systems to shut down; long exposure may lead to death. Insects survive colder winters through the process of overwintering, which occurs at all stages of development and may include migration or hibernation for different insects, the latter of which must be done in hibernacula. Insects that do not migrate must halt their growth to avoid freezing to death, in a process called diapause. Insects prepare to overwinter through a variety of mechanisms, such as using anti-freeze proteins or cryoprotectants in freeze-avoidant insects, like soybean aphids. Cryoprotectants are toxic, with high concentrations only tolerated at low temperatures. Thus, hibernacula are used to avoid sporadic warming and the risk of death due high concentrations of cryoprotectants at warmer temperatures. Freeze-tolerant insects, like second-generation corn-borers, can survive being frozen and therefore, undergo inoculative freezing. Hibernacula range in size and structure depending on the insects using them.

However, insect hibernacula are generally required to be:

- Well-insulated from extreme temperature changes
- Protected from weather
- Dry (except for freeze-tolerant insects)

=== Lady bugs ===
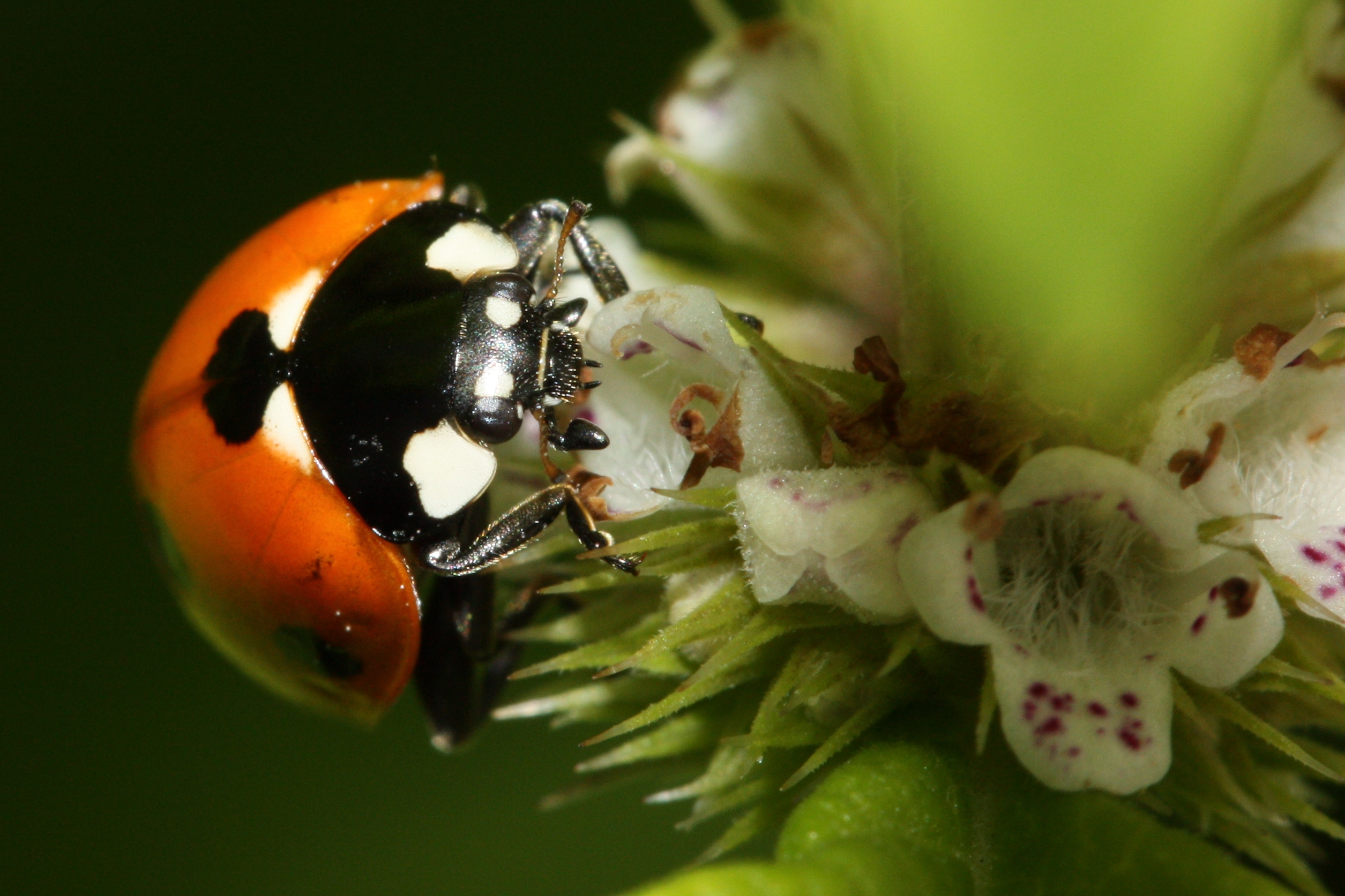
A lady beetle sits on a flower, drinking nectar.

Some insects, like convergent lady bugs, reuse the same hibernacula, year after year. They converge with other lady beetles and migrate to hibernacula used by prior generations. They are able to find old hibernacula due to hydrocarbons released by lady beetle feet which create a lasting path. This allows lady beetles to retrace their footsteps to previously used hibernacula. Their tendency to aggregate and overwinter in groups is likely due to their attraction to similar environments and conspecifics. Beetles use rock crevices as hibernacula, often clumping in them, in groups. These rock crevices are found in rock fields the beetle are attracted to for high levels of vegetation and greenery.

=== Other insects ===
Other types of insect hibernacula include self-spun silk hibernacula, such as those made and used by spruce budworms as they moult and overwinter in their second instars. An example is the eastern spruce budworm which creates hibernacula after dispersing during its first instar then overwinter before emerging from the hibernacula in early May. Woolly bear caterpillars overwinter as caterpillars and grow to be isabella tiger moths. They use plant debris as makeshift hibernacula, to protect themselves from extreme elements. Some butterflies, like the white admiral butterfly also only mature halfway as a caterpillar before hibernating for the winter. For freeze-avoidant insects, ideal hibernacula are dry, as freeze-avoidant insects are less likely to dampen and freeze in them, however moist hibernacula promote inoculative freezing for freeze-tolerant insects.

== Amphibians ==
Amphibians that hibernate include several species of frogs and salamanders from the northern continental climates of North America and Eurasia and also from extreme Southern Hemisphere climates. These amphibians slow their metabolism during winter to avoid unsuitable conditions, such as freezing. Most freeze avoidance strategies include overwintering in aquatic situations or burrowing in the soil to depths below the frostline. A hibernaculum for amphibians should provide the following:

- Optimum temperatures
- Maintenance of oxygen and humidity levels
- Low-intensity, short-photoperiod lighting
- Minimum disturbance

Species from cool continental climates hibernate at temperatures from 0 to 4 °C. Some species will not survive hibernation at temperatures that exceed 4 °C.

Generally, for amphibians that hibernate under ice, it is necessary for the animal to be submerged in water that is 10 to 15 cm deep and to maintain the temperature between 2 and 3 °C and not above 4 °C. The water should be well aerated, with maintained low-intensity light levels and minimal disturbance of the amphibians.

=== Frogs ===
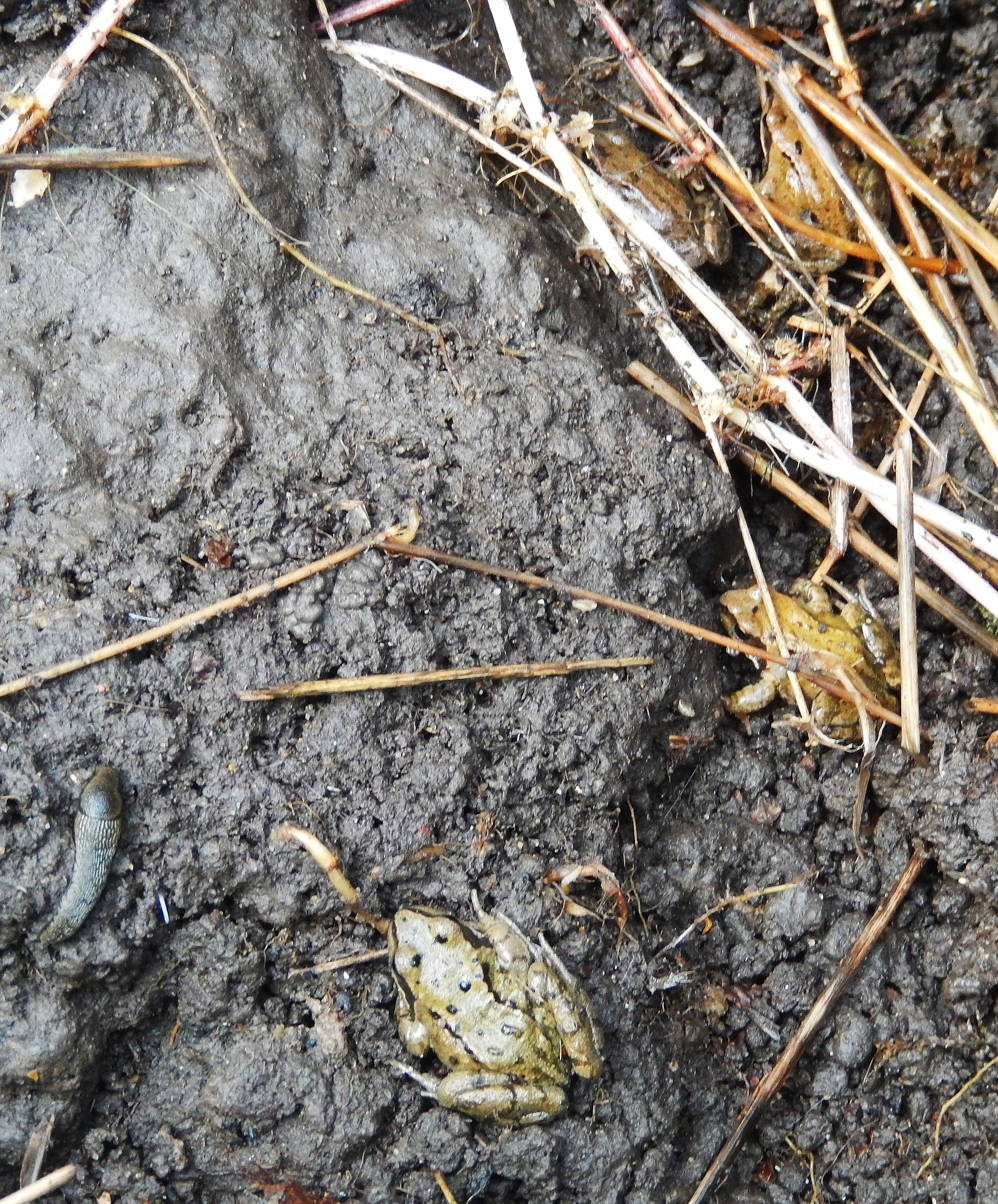
Frogs wintering at their hibernaculum at Gunnersbury Triangle in London

Like other amphibians, frogs show minimal capacities for freezing tolerance and survive winter by using terrestrial hibernacula where they avoid freezing. However, frogs may exhibit greater freeze-tolerance capacity at high latitude range limits, where winter climate is more severe. For example, data suggests that while cricket frogs in South Dakota survive winter by locating hibernacula that prevent freezing, their toleration of short freezing bouts may expand the range of suitable hibernacula. However, overwinter mortality may be high at the northern range boundary due to colder temperatures and might limit cricket frogs from expanding their range northward.

The microclimate refers to the climate of a very small or restricted area, like the hibernaculum, especially when this differs from the climate of the surrounding area. Overwinter survival in these cricket frogs among other frogs is dependent on using hibernacula with appropriate physical microclimate characteristics, such as moist soil, that buffer frogs from temperatures that drop below the freezing point of the body fluids for extended periods. Although, determining if frogs can identify sites with appropriate microclimates to support overwinter survival and what factors might inform such choices are still unknown and will require further study. Therefore, it is still not known to what extent various types of prospective hibernacula for frogs might be suitable in the years to come, especially factoring in climate change.

=== Newts ===
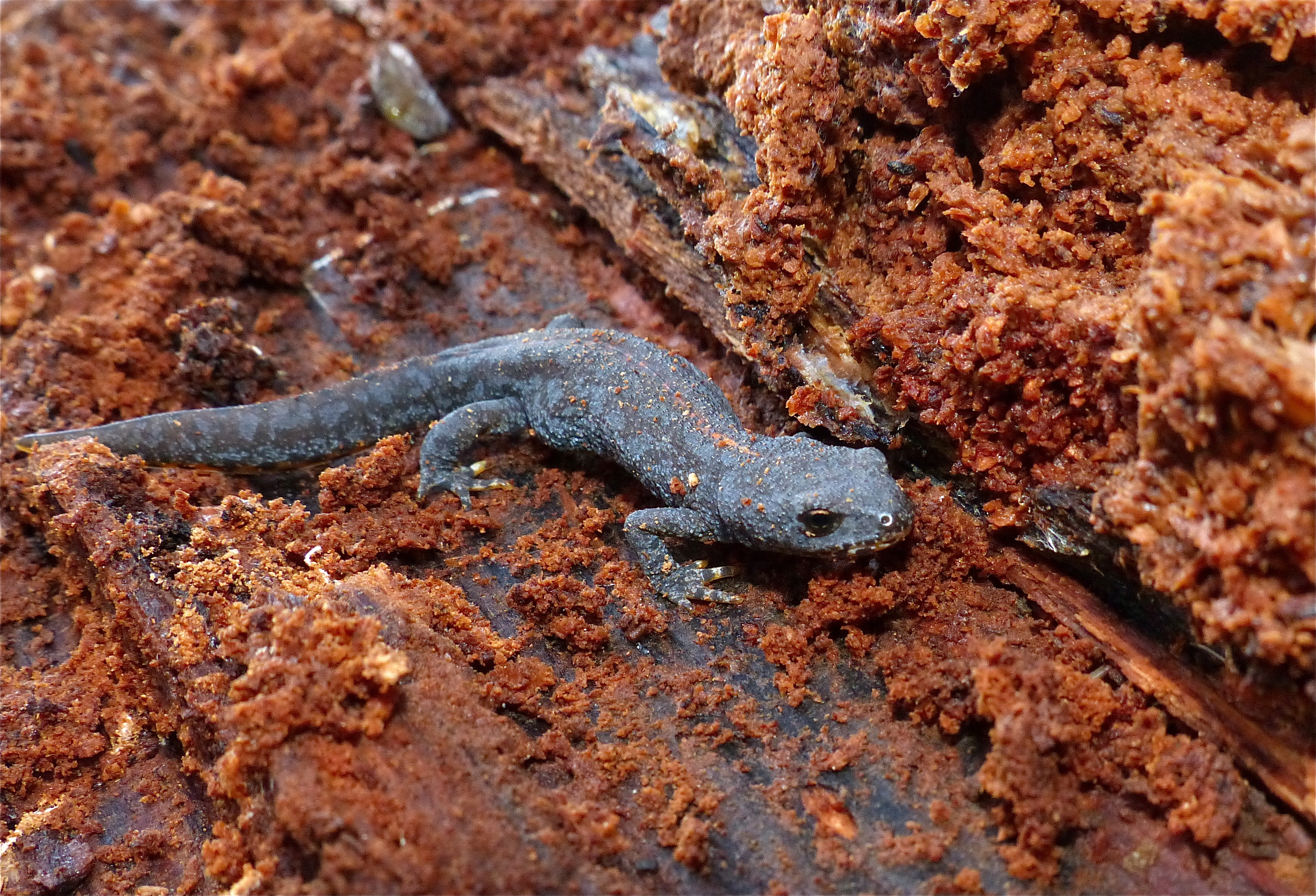
Alpine newt hibernating in dead wood

As part the Highways Agency Biodiversity Action Plan (HABAP) in the UK, the Species Action Plan (SAP) for great crested newts aims to maintain and enhance existing newt populations through appropriate management of suitable habitat. As part of steps to implement the HABAP, newt hibernacula (e.g. log piles) have been constructed to improve the quality of the terrestrial habitat through increasing the number of potential overwintering sites. It was also determined that habitat surrounding breeding ponds with plenty of cover and suitable overwintering sites may have less need for provision of artificial hibernacula than landscapes with less woodland, hedgerows, scrub etc. Because great crested newts show high loyalty to overwintering locations, returning to such established areas year after year, artificial hibernacula could be important in future years to conserve newts and other amphibians. Although, monitoring in the vicinity of these hibernacula in autumn using felt roofing tiles did not reveal the presence of any great crested newts even though they are known to breed in nearby ponds. Common toads and frogs did surround the area however. Therefore, further studies need to be conducted in order to create species-appropriate artificial hibernacula.

== Reptiles ==
Many reptiles undergo hibernation or a process called brumation, which is similar to hibernation; both processes require usage of a hibernaculum. Staying inside an insulated hibernaculum is a strategy to avoid the harsh winter months when the frigid outside temperatures may kill an ectothermic reptile. They depress their metabolism and heart rates to reduce energy consumption so they don't need to exit their hibernacula. Hibernating reptiles are also safer from predation inside of their concealed and protected hibernacula. Various species of turtles, snakes, and lizards all use hibernacula, the forms of which can vary greatly.

Hibernacula are typically:

- Underground
- Below the frost line
- Well-insulated
- Tunnels (i.e. snakes) or cavities large enough for the body (i.e. lizards)

=== Turtles ===
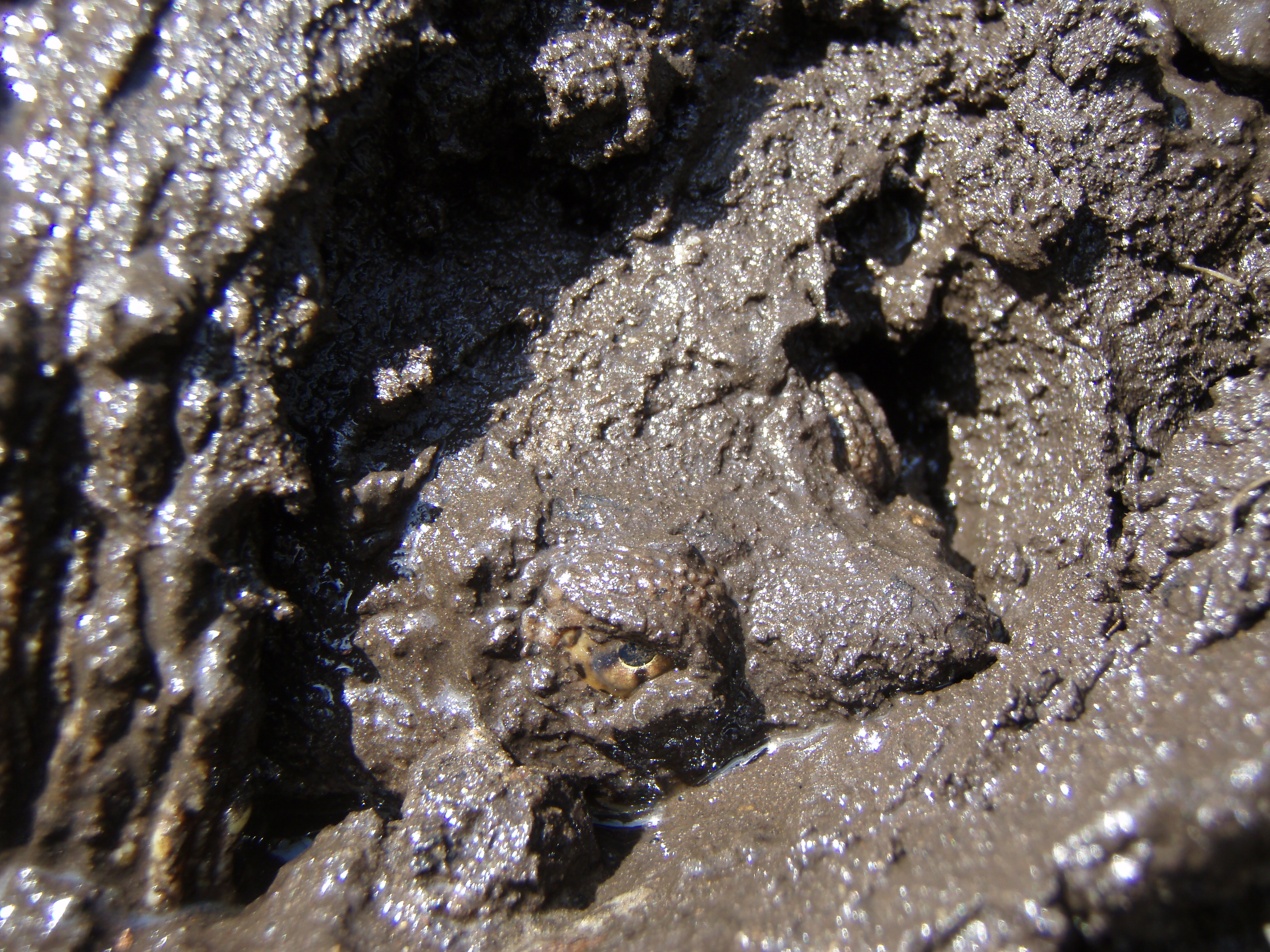
An adult snapping turtle emerging from its stream-bank hibernaculum

Common snapping turtles generally hibernate for about six months from early October to mid-April. They live in lakes during their active months, then travel to small offshoot streams to hibernate. Hibernacula are about 100–150 meters away from the main body of the home lake. Most snapping turtles hibernate by burrowing into the banks of alder streams or vegetated streams, but some use other structures such as abandoned beaver dens. These streams are typically less than 0.3 m deep and 0.7 m wide, covered by sunken alder roots or fallen trees, and not covered by ice in the winter. Many animals return to the same stream to hibernate in subsequent years.

=== Snakes ===
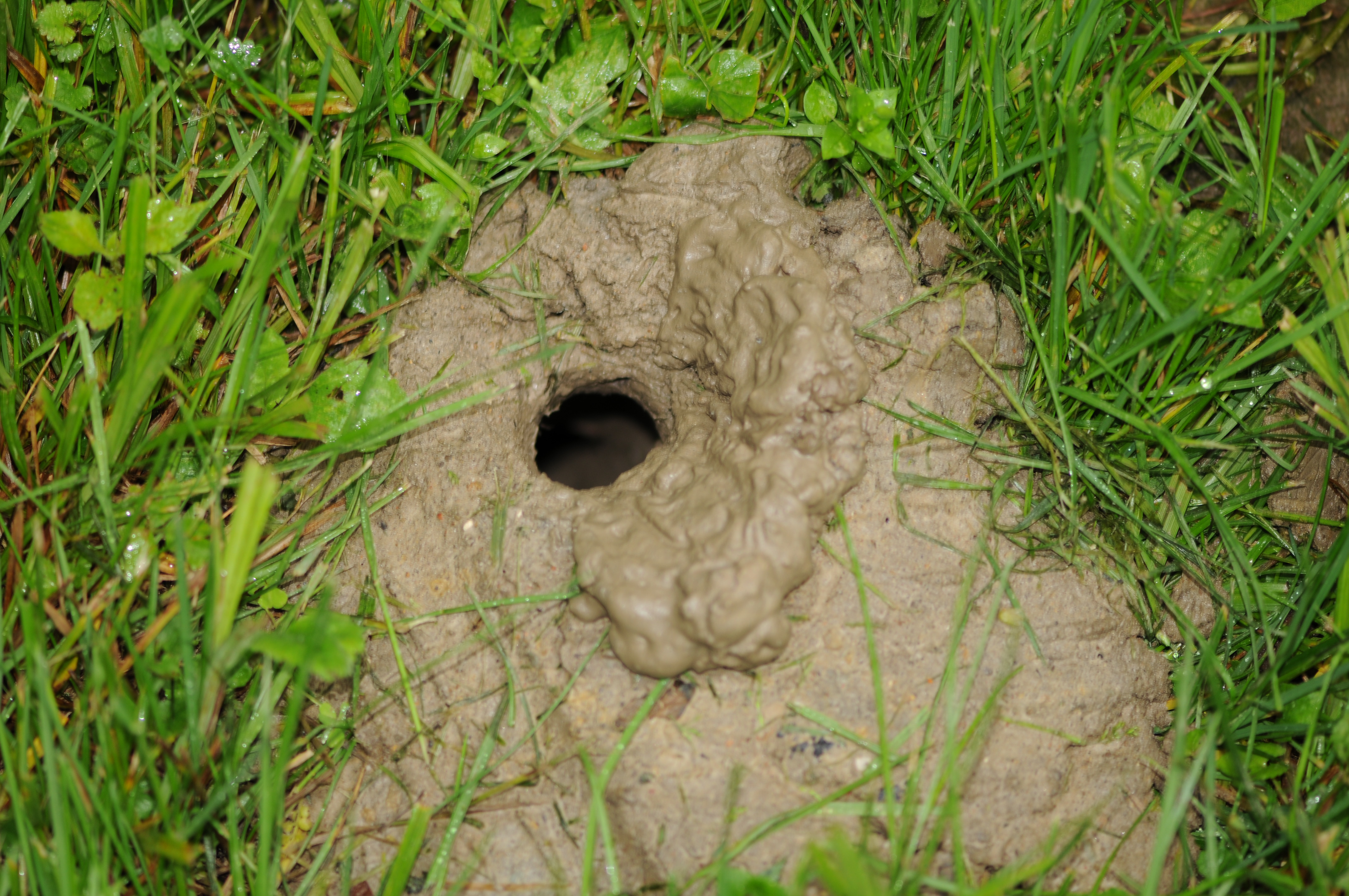
An outside view of a snake burrow (species unknown)

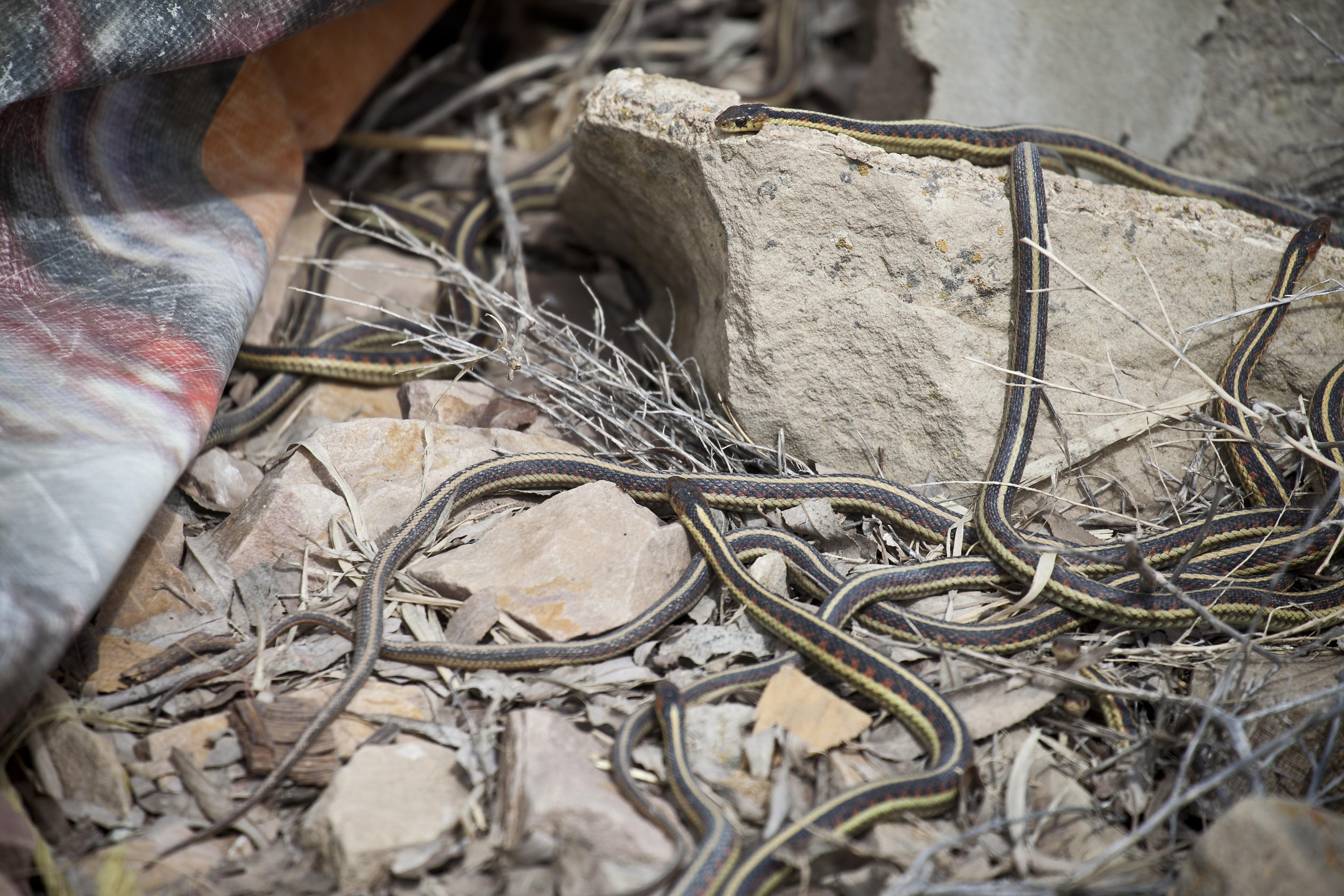
Garter snakes famously form large aggregations in their hibernacula.

Unlike more solitary snapping turtles, snakes may either hibernate alone or in large aggregations of up to several thousand individuals of the same or different species. They use a wide variety of hibernacula, including: rock piles, debris-filled wells, caves, crevices, unused burrows made by other animals, and ant mounds. The common European viper has actually been observed using all of the hibernacula listed above. Most species seem to prefer finding an already-present suitable site rather than constructing one of their own, but they do expand upon present structures and may make their own burrows if there aren't any quality sites available. Pine snakes and the closely related Louisiana pine snakes are two of the most well-studied hibernating snake species, and share similar hibernacula characteristics. These species sometimes construct their own burrows, or use tunnels formed from the decay of tree roots or by gophers. The tunnels form complex networks, and have side chambers which each house one snake.

A fossil specimen of the stem group-boa Hibernophis is known from the White River Formation of Wyoming, comprising 4 individuals preserved together in a hibernaculum. This indicates that the aggregating behavior of brumating snakes dates back to at least the Early Oligocene.

=== Lizards ===
Mesquite lizards in Mexico and the southern United States have been found hibernating in groups of 2 to 8 in cracks or under slabs of bark in mesquite trees. Common collared lizards spend about six months hibernating, almost always solitarily, though pairs of juvenile females have been observed within the same hibernaculum. They use the undersides of rock slabs as hibernacula, digging a small chamber in the dirt just large enough for their bodies with a small tunnel for outside access. Adults use larger rock slabs, dig deeper chambers, and have longer tunnels than juveniles. Perhaps the most extreme example is seen in the viviparous lizard, the most northern of all lizards. They can burrow into the soil, go under leaf litter, or use shelters like rocks as hibernacula. Although the air temperature in West Siberia can drop to −10 °C, the soil temperature at the depths where these lizards hibernate remains higher than −10 °C. This enables them to survive the harshest temperatures of any lizard.

== Mammals ==
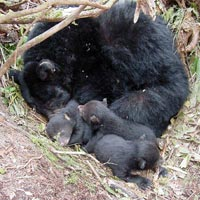
Black bear mother and cubs hibernating, utilizing a hibernaculum as a maternity den

Like other animals, mammals hibernate during seasons of harsh environmental conditions and resource scarcity. As it requires less energy to maintain homeostasis and survive when an individual is hibernating, this is a cost-effective strategy to increase survival rates. Hibernation is usually perceived as taking place during winter, as in the most well-known hibernators bears and bats, but can also occur during the dry season when there is little food or water, as in the mouse lemurs of Madagascar. Given that mammals can spend anywhere from 1 to 9 months hibernating, their choice in hibernaculum is essential in determining their survival.

Hibernacula vary greatly, but are typically:

- Underground (i.e. ground squirrels, mouse lemurs, bears) or in a protected shelter (i.e. bats, bears)
- Concealed
- Attuned to environmental conditions, such as temperature
- Either reused consistently (i.e. bats, ground squirrels) or very rarely (i.e. bears, mouse lemurs)

=== Bears ===
Many bears occupy similar hibernacula to smaller mammals, but theirs are, of course, much larger and can vary greatly across and within species. Most black bears excavate dens into a hillside or at the base of a tree, stump, or shrub, but some make dens at the bases of hollow trees, in hollow logs, or in rock caves or cavities. Den reuse is observed in this species, but very rarely. There were no significant den size differences between age or sex classes, except adult males creating larger entrances. Grizzly bears likewise don't show age or sex class differences in den dimensions. Grizzlies prefer hibernacula sites with abundant ground and canopy cover, and abundant sweet-vetch. Polar bears differ from black bears, grizzlies, and other bear species where both sexes hibernate in that only females use hibernacula. Like other female bears, polar bears use hibernacula as maternity dens. Also like other species, they tend to dig dens into the earth, although their Arctic hibernacula are usually covered with snow by the time they emerge.

=== Bats ===
Bats favor larger hibernacula where large groups may roost together, including natural caves, mines, cellars, and other kinds of underground sites and man-made structures, like ice-houses. Within these hibernacula, the bats are still highly tuned to environmental factors. Little brown bats in northern latitudes hibernate for up to eight months during the winter, and leave their roosts in the warm spring weather when insect prey is plentiful again. Bats gauge the outside temperature by being attuned to the airflow at the hibernacula entrance, which is driven by temperature differences between inside and outside the hibernacula, allowing bats to leave when the temperature begins to warm. Some hibernacula are shared between multiple species, such as common pipistrelles roosting with soprano pipistrelles. Behavior other than hibernating can also occur at hibernacula; common pipistrelles produce most of their mating calls and mate with each other in and near their hibernacula.

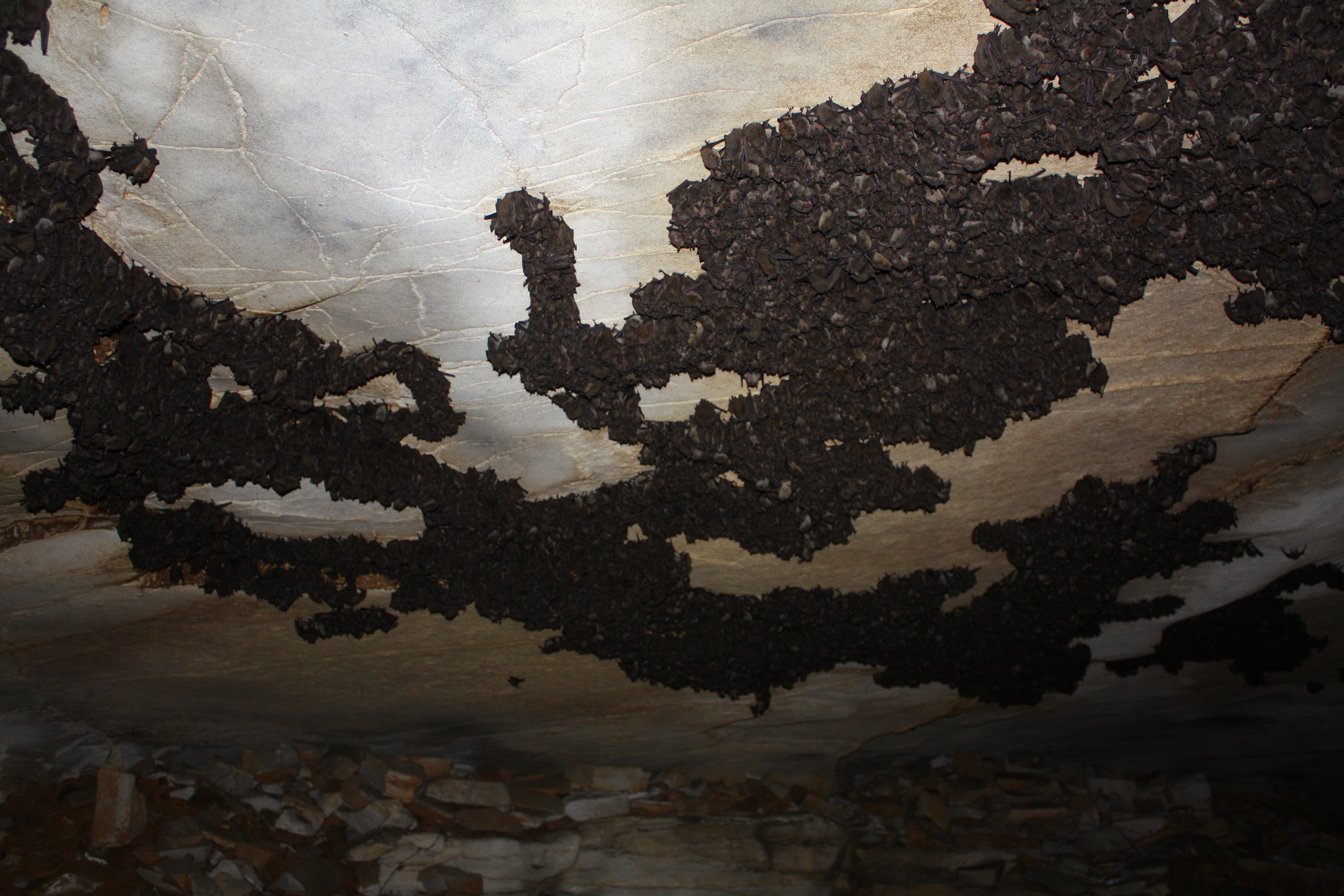
Gray bats congregating and using the entirety of a natural cave as a hibernaculum

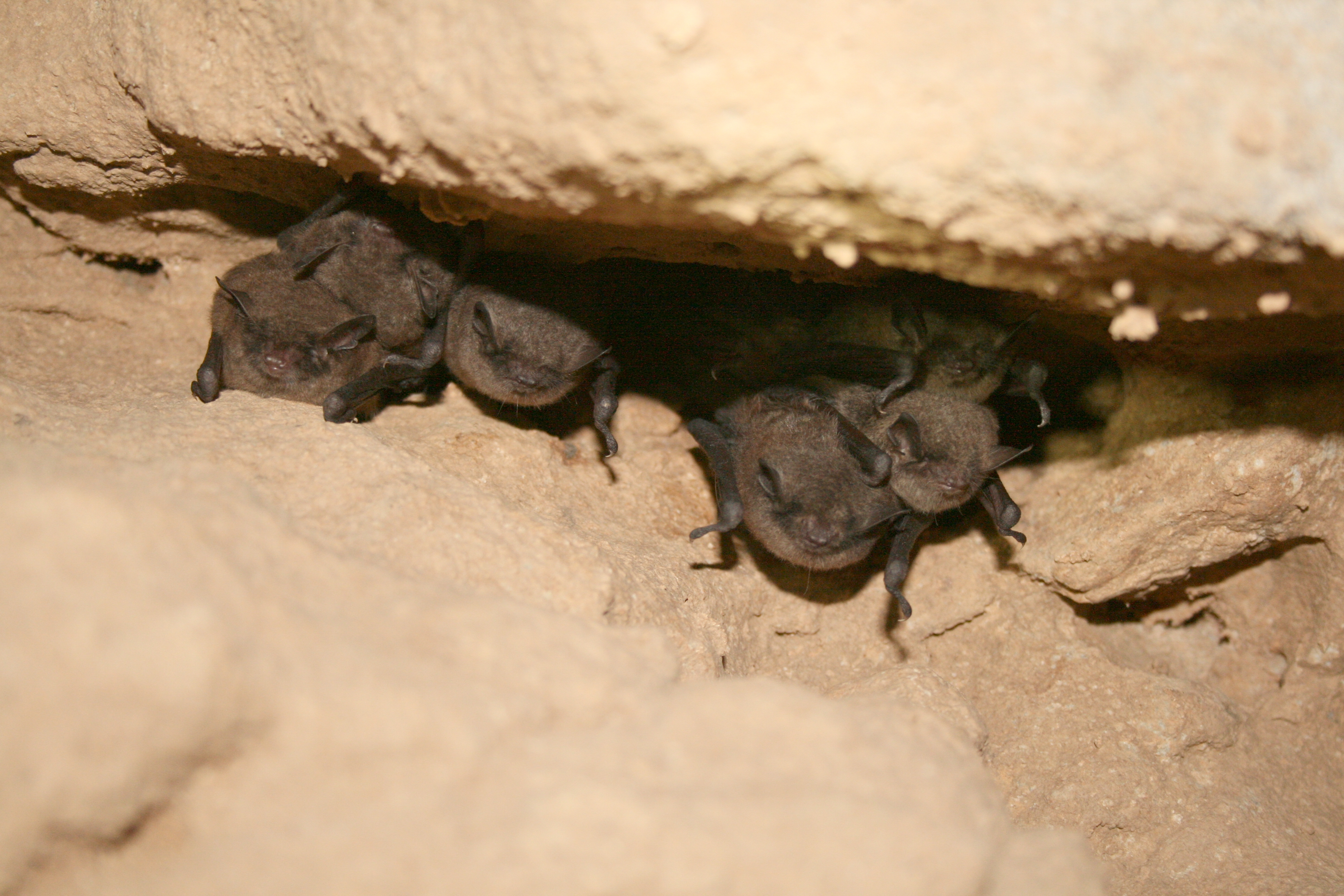
Indiana bats hibernating in a cave, which functions as their hibernaculum

=== Other small mammals ===
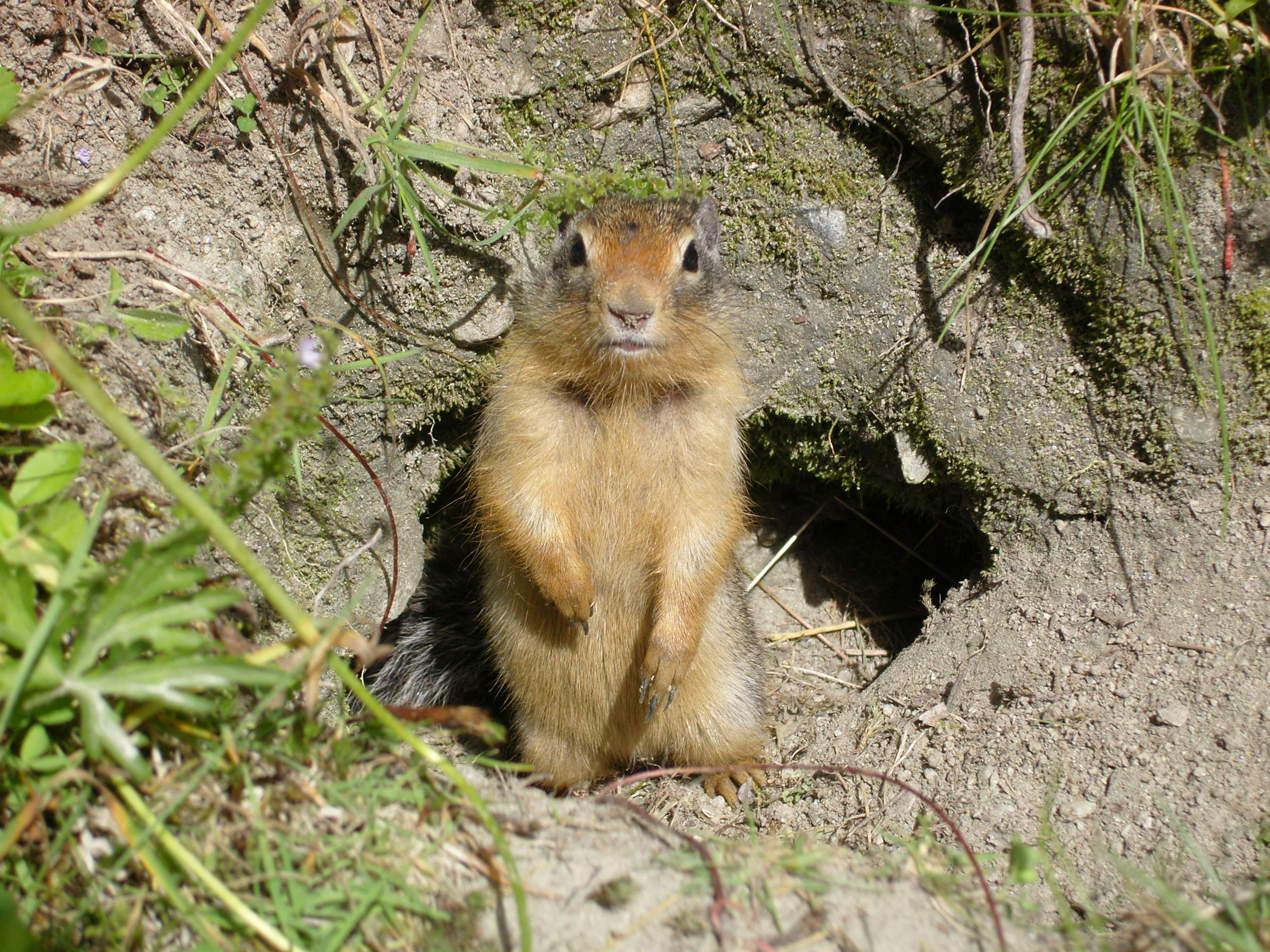
Columbian ground squirrel outside its burrow hibernaculum

Many hibernating, small-bodied mammals hibernate in simple holes in the ground, though some use complex systems of tunnels and burrows. Mountain pygmy possums in New South Wales, Australia, dig holes in the ground to form hibernacula, with the preferred location being in boulder fields under a layer of snow. During the first few months of hibernation, possums awaken occasionally and leave one hibernaculum in favor of another, seemingly in an effort to find the hibernaculum with the most suitable microclimate. The reddish-gray mouse lemur also wakes and leaves the hibernaculum spontaneously and for brief periods of time. Their hibernacula are located in holes in large trees with varying levels of insulation. However, the range of insulation levels is relatively narrow, as there are often small numbers of suitably large trees. There can be hibernacula differences even within a species. In Columbian ground squirrels, hibernacula size is proportional to the weight of the individual occupying it, with adults having deeper hibernacula than juveniles, unlike black bears. Most juveniles choose to hibernate within 20 meters of their mother's burrow; those that don't have higher mortality rates.

== See also ==
- Dead hedge
- Insect hotel
