= Frank Dietrich =

Frank Dietrich is the name of:

- Frank Sigel Dietrich (1863–1930), United States federal judge
- Frank Dietrich (footballer) (born 1959), German footballer
- Frank Dietrich (politician) (1966–2011), German politician
- Frank Dietrich (rower) (born 1965), German rower
