= Bassum station =

Railway station in Bassum, Germany

Bassum
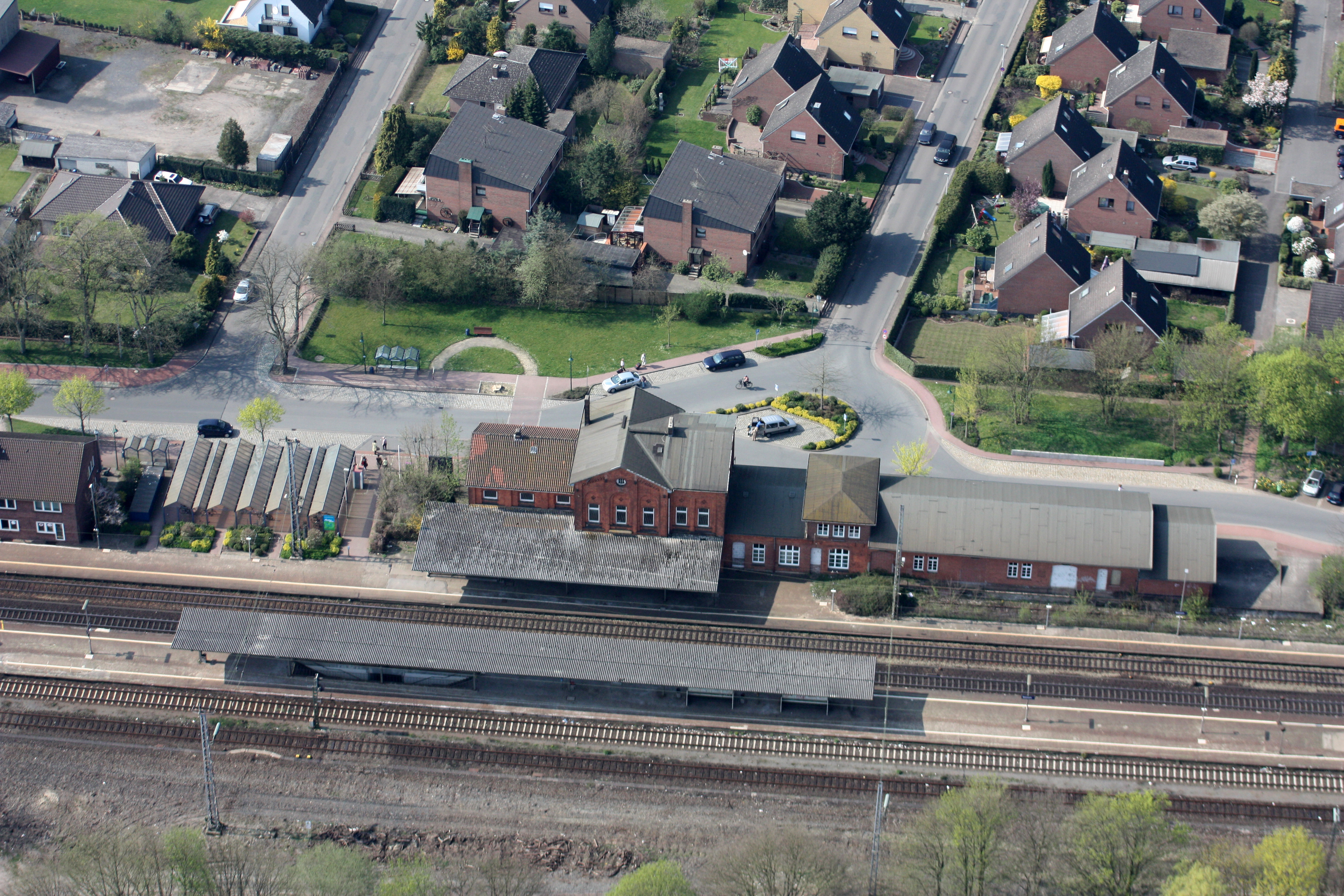
- Bassum railway station

General information
- Location: Bassum, Lower Saxony; Germany
- Coordinates: 52.8475°N 8.7399°E
- Lines: Wanne-Eickel–Hamburg railway; Bassum–Herford railway (closed)
- Platforms: 2

Other information
- Station code: 425
- DS100 code: HBAS
- Category: 5
- Fare zone: VBN: 530
- Website: www.bahnhof.de

Services
Preceding station	DB Regio Nord	Following station
Syke towards Bremerhaven-Lehe	RE 9	Twistringen towards Osnabrück Hbf
Preceding station	Bremen S-Bahn	Following station
Bramstedt bei Syke towards Bremerhaven-Lehe	RS2	Twistringen Terminus
Location

Bassum (German: Bahnhof Bassum) is a railway station located in Bassum, Germany. The station is located on the Wanne-Eickel–Hamburg railway. The train services are operated by Deutsche Bahn and NordWestBahn. The station has been part of the Bremen S-Bahn since December 2010.

== Train services ==
The following services currently call at the station:

- Regional services RE 9 Bremerhaven-Lehe - Bremen - Osnabrück
- Bremen S-Bahn services RS 2 Bremerhaven-Lehe - Osterholz-Scharmbeck - Bremen - Twistringen
