= Barrien station =

Railway station in Barrien, Germany

Coordinates: 52.9468°N 8.8185°E

Barrien
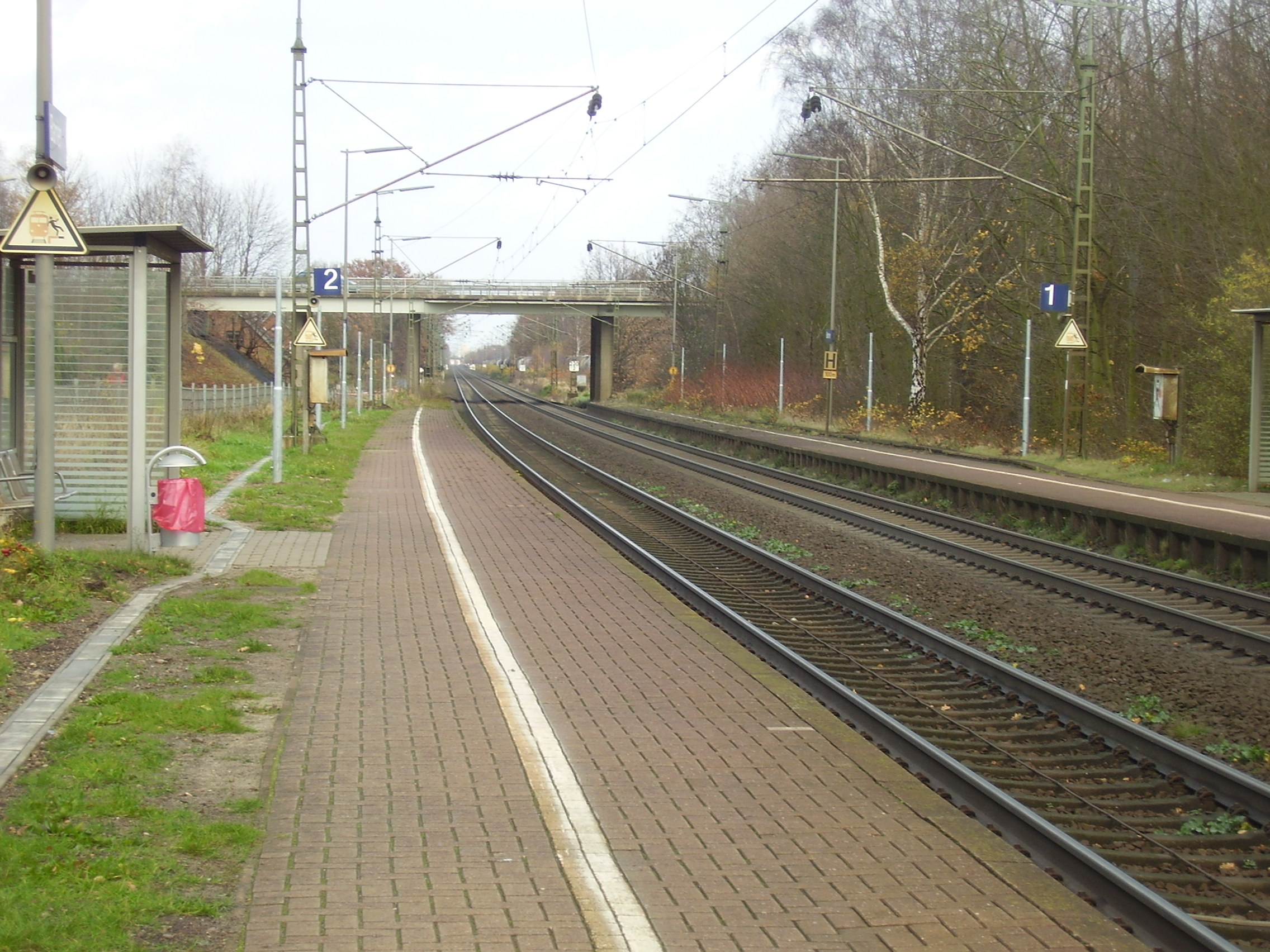
- Barrien railway station

General information
- Location: Barrien, Lower Saxony; Germany
- Line: Wanne-Eickel–Hamburg railway
- Platforms: 2
- Tracks: 2

Other information
- Fare zone: VBN: 510 and 520

Services
Preceding station	Bremen S-Bahn	Following station
Kirchweyhe towards Bremerhaven-Lehe	RS2	Syke towards Twistringen
Location

Barrien (German: Bahnhof Barrien) is a railway station located in Barrien, Germany. The station is located on the Wanne-Eickel–Hamburg railway and the train services are operated by NordWestBahn. The station has been part of the Bremen S-Bahn since December 2010.

== Train services ==
The station is served by the following services:

- Bremen S-Bahn services RS 2 Bremerhaven-Lehe - Osterholz-Scharmbeck - Bremen - Twistringen
