= Bassum =

- Town
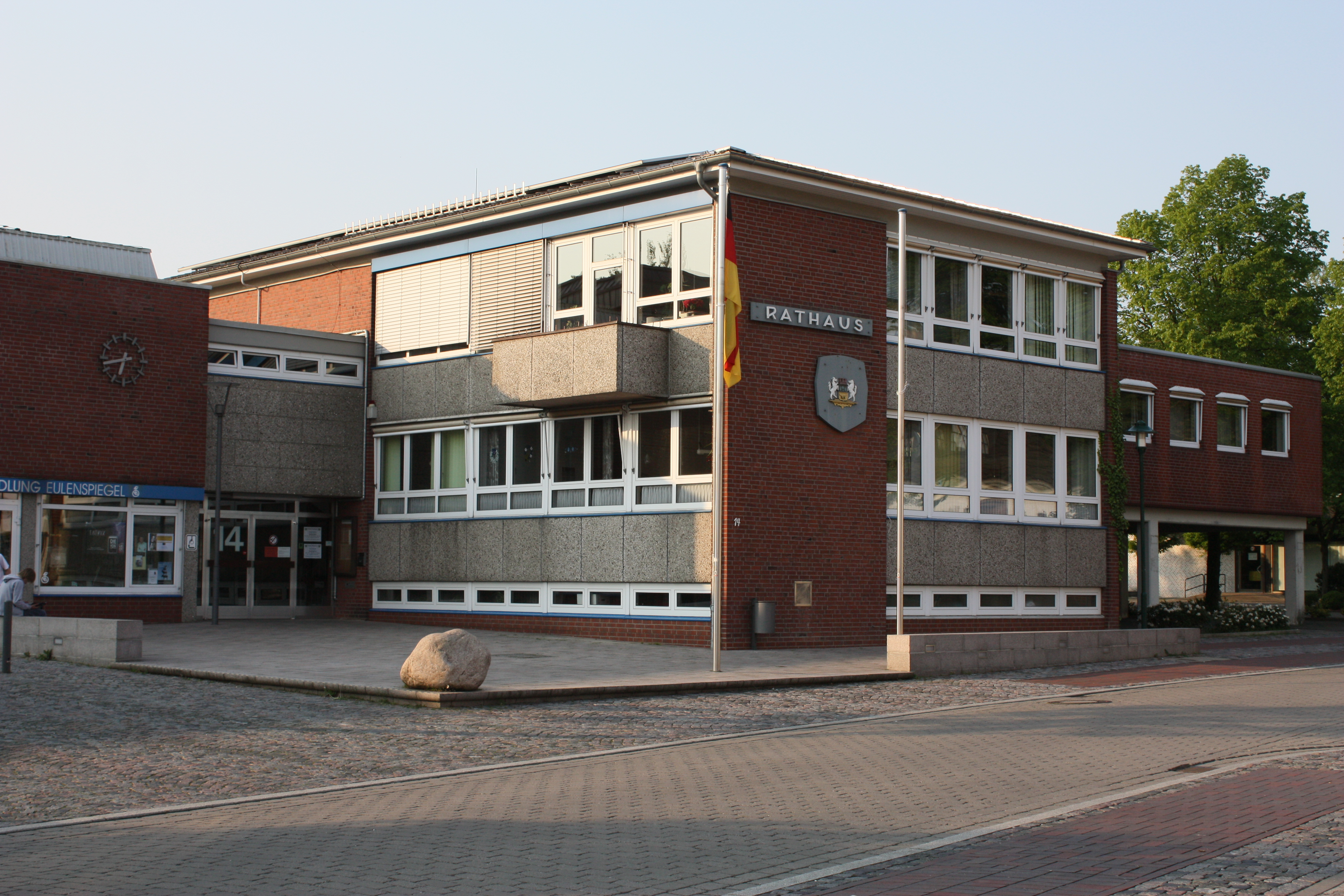
- The Seat of local government (Rathaus)

- Flag Coat of arms

- Location of Bassum within Diepholz district
- Interactive map of Bassum
- Location within Germany Location within Lower Saxony
- Coordinates: 52°50′58″N 8°43′36″E
- Country: Germany
- State: Lower Saxony
- District: Diepholz
- Subdivisions: 16 Ortschaften

Government
  - Mayor (2021–26): Christian Porsch

Area
  - Total: 168.85 km^{2} (65.19 sq mi)
- Elevation: 42 m (138 ft)

Population (2025-12-31)
  - Total: 16,617
  - Density: 98.413/km^{2} (254.89/sq mi)
- Time zone: UTC+01:00 (CET)
  - Summer (DST): UTC+02:00 (CEST)
- Postal codes: 27211
- Dialling codes: 04241
- Vehicle registration: DH
- Website: www.bassum.de

Bassum (German pronunciation: [ˈbasʊm]; Northern Low Saxon: Bassen) is a town in the district of Diepholz, Lower Saxony, Germany. It is situated approximately 35 km northeast of Diepholz, and 25 km south of Bremen.

== Geography ==
=== Subdivision ===
Subdivision of Bassum

Besides Bassum proper, the town consists of the following Ortschaften (villages):

- Albringhausen
- Apelstedt (with Pannstedt)
- Bramstedt (with Bünte and Röllinghausen)
- Eschenhausen
- Groß Henstedt
- Great Ringmar
- Hallstedt
- Hollwedel (with Dimhausen, Möhlenhof, Hilken, Katenkamp, Nüstedt, Klein and Groß Hollwedel)
- Neubruchhausen (with Freidorf)
- Nienstedt
- Nordwohlde (with Stütelberg, Fesenfeld, Kastendiek, Steinforth, Högenhausen, Kätingen and Pestinghausen)
- Osterbinde
- Schorlingborstel (with Ebersheide, Lowe and Kolloge)
- Stühren
- Wedehorn
- Bassum (with Loge, Freudenberg, Klenkenborstel, Hassel, Nienhaus and Nienhaus)

== Politics ==
=== Town council ===
Bassum Local election 2016
Parties	Votes	%	+/-	Seats	+/-
Christian Democratic Union of Germany	7237	34.2	-2.2	10 / 29	-1
Social Democratic Party of Germany	4331	20.4	-2.6	6 / 29	-1
Bürger-Block	4331	20.4	-0.2	6 / 29	±0
Alliance 90/The Greens	2614	12.3	-3.3	4 / 29	-1
The Left	753	2.7	+0.8	1 / 29	±0
Free Democratic Party	570	2.7	+2.7	1 / 29	+1
Helmut Zurmühlen	1418	6.7	+6.7	1 / 29	+1
Total		100%		29	

=== Mayor ===
Bassum mayoral election 2014
Candidates	Party	Round 1		Round 2	
Candidates	Party	Votes	%	Votes	%
Christian Porsch		2,476	33.45 %	3,087	56.31 %
Claus Marx		2,175	29.38 %	2,395	43.69%
Bernadette Nadermann		1,619	21.87%		
Cathleen Schorling	CDU	1,132	15.29%		
Total Votes		7,402	99.99%	5,482	100%
Eligible Voters		13,193		13,193	
Turnout		7,402	56,79 %	5,482	41,92 %
Source: City of Bassum

=== Coat of arms ===
Coat of arms of the City of Bassum	"Party per fess Argent an upright branch vert with three tilia leaves and Or two armed gules bear claws outwards sable; above a ornamental pedestal Or, two horses rampant Argent as supporters, in the crest a three towered mural crown gules.” The arms were granted on November 24, 1927. The lower part shows the bear claws derived from the arms of the Counts of Hoya. to which the city belonged to since 1582. The tilia leaves in the upper represent the three former municipalities Bassum, Freudenberg and Loge who built the new city of Bassum in 1896. The mural crown, symbolises the 13th century Freudenburg castle and the city rights as well and two horses as supporters stand for the belonging to Lower Saxony.

=== International relations ===
Bassum has twinning arrangements with:

- Fresnay-sur-Sarthe, France (1972)
- Telšiai, Lithuania (2009)
- Spilsby, United Kingdom (2010)

== Notable residents ==
=== Born in Bassum ===
- Elisabeth Wiedemann (1926-2015), German actress
- Tessa Hofmann (born 1949), scholar of Armenian studies and sociology
- Hans-Hermann Sprado (1956–2014), German journalist and author, editor and publisher of P.M. Magazine
- Ulf Schirmer (born 1959), German conductor, general music director of the Leipzig Opera
- Roman Fricke (born 1977), German high jumper, participant in the Olympics Athens 2004
- Christian Schulz (born 1983), German footballer

=== Associated with the town ===
- The songwriter Konstantin Wecker (born 1947), married in 1996 Annik Wecker born Berlin; she grew up in Bassum
- Herbert Zimmermann, (1917-1966), officer in World War II, radio reporter of the Football game Germany-Hungary FIFA World Cup 1954, died in 1966 in the district Wiebusch in a traffic accident

== See also ==
- Bassum station
- Bramstedt bei Syke railway station
