= Kirchweyhe station =

Railway station in Kirchweyhe, Germany

Kirchweyhe
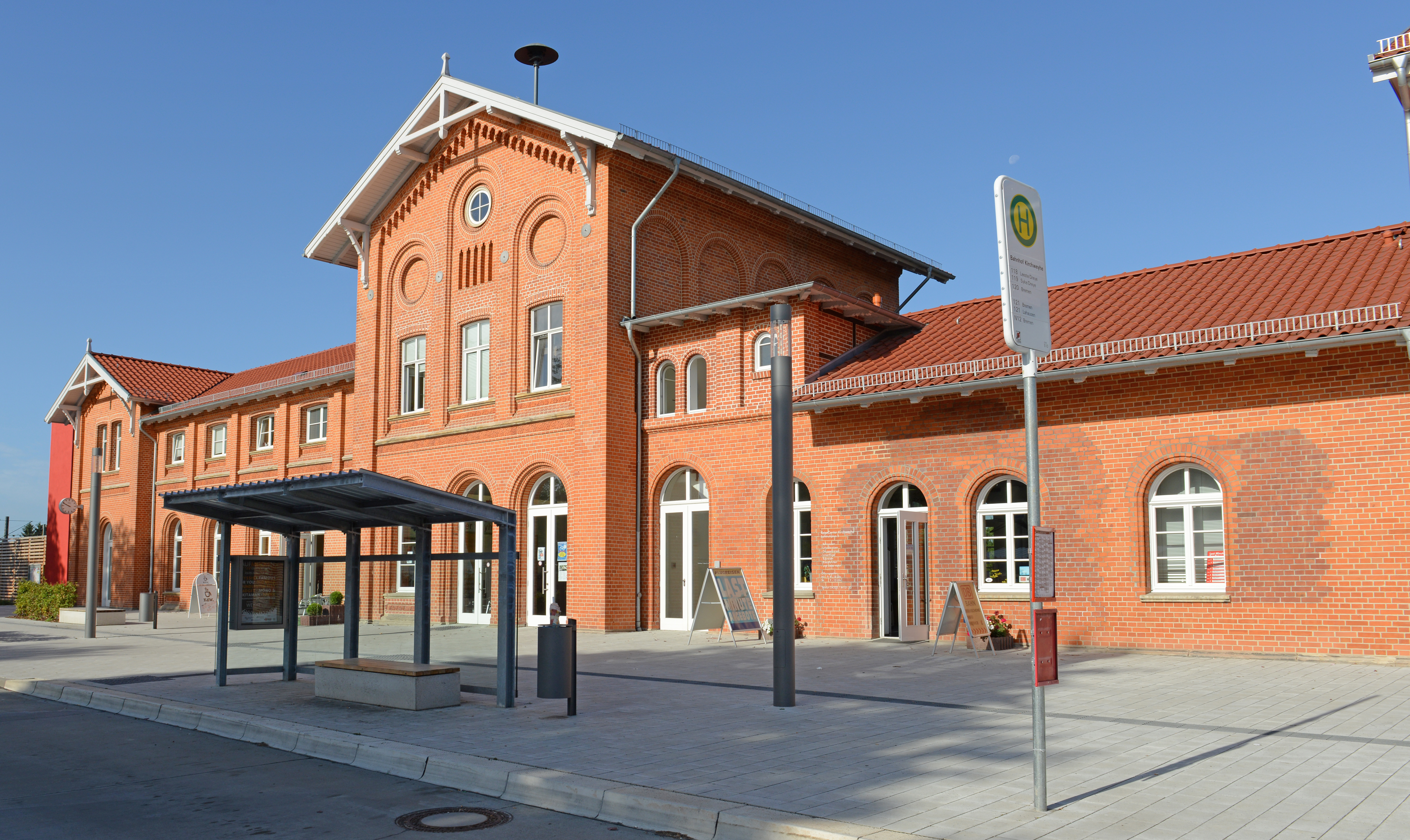
- Kirchweyhe railway station

General information
- Location: Weyhe, Lower Saxony; Germany
- Coordinates: 52.9836°N 8.8475°E
- Line: Wanne-Eickel–Hamburg railway
- Platforms: 2

Other information
- Station code: n/a
- DS100 code: HKI
- Category: 5
- Fare zone: VBN: 510

Services
| Preceding station | DB Regio Nord | Following station |
|---|---|---|
| Bremen Hbf towards Bremerhaven-Lehe | RE 9 | Syke towards Osnabrück Hbf |
| Preceding station | Bremen S-Bahn | Following station |
| Dreye towards Bremerhaven-Lehe | RS2 | Barrien towards Twistringen |
Location

Kirchweyhe (German: Bahnhof Kirchweyhe) is a railway station located in Weyhe, Germany. The station was opened on 15 May 1873 and is located on the Wanne-Eickel–Hamburg railway. The train services are operated by Deutsche Bahn and NordWestBahn. The station has been part of the Bremen S-Bahn since December 2010.

== Train services ==
The following services currently call at the station:

- Regional services RE 9 Bremerhaven-Lehe - Bremen - Osnabrück
- Bremen S-Bahn services RS 2 Bremerhaven-Lehe - Osterholz-Scharmbeck - Bremen - Twistringen
