= Syke station =

Railway station in Syke, Germany

Syke
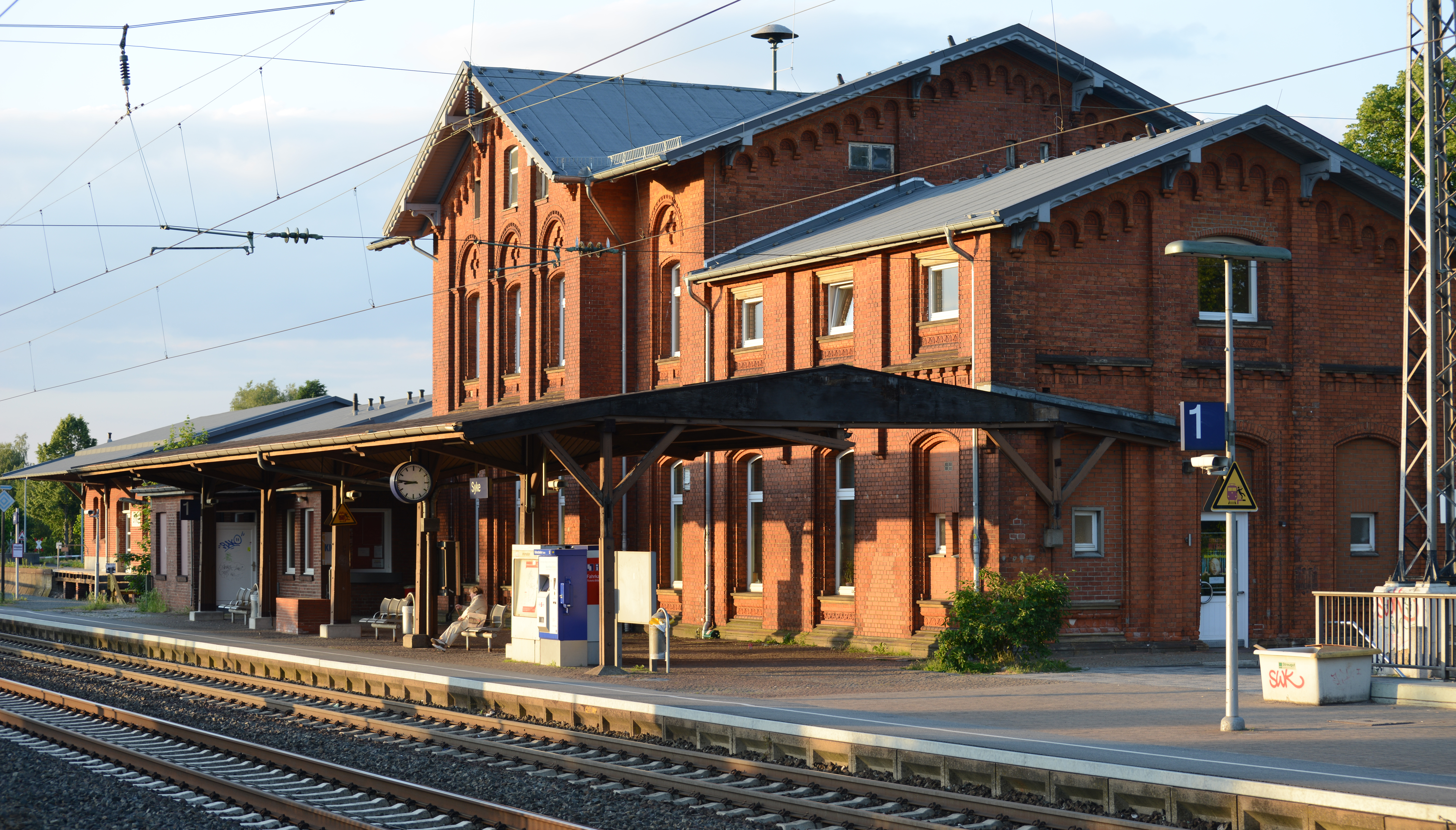
- Syke railway station

General information
- Location: Syke, Lower Saxony; Germany
- Coordinates: 52.9162°N 8.8102°E
- Line: Wanne-Eickel–Hamburg railway
- Platforms: 3

Other information
- Fare zone: VBN: 520

Services
Preceding station	DB Regio Nord	Following station
Kirchweyhe towards Bremerhaven-Lehe	RE 9	Bassum towards Osnabrück Hbf
Preceding station	Bremen S-Bahn	Following station
Barrien towards Bremerhaven-Lehe	RS2	Bramstedt bei Syke towards Twistringen
Location

Syke (German: Bahnhof Syke) is a railway station located in Syke, Germany. The station is located on the Wanne-Eickel–Hamburg railway. The train services are operated by Deutsche Bahn and NordWestBahn. The station has been part of the Bremen S-Bahn since December 2010.

== Train services ==
The following services currently call at the station:

- Regional services RE 9 Bremerhaven-Lehe - Bremen - Osnabrück
- Bremen S-Bahn services RS 2 Bremerhaven-Lehe - Osterholz-Scharmbeck - Bremen - Twistringen

== Museum Railway ==
The Eisenbahn der Grafschaft Hoya operates to this station from Hoya and Eystrup.
