= Bramstedt bei Syke station =

Railway station in Bramstedt, Germany

Bramstedt (bei Syke)

General information
- Location: Bassum, Lower Saxony; Germany
- Coordinates: 52.8716°N 8.7861°E
- Line: Wanne-Eickel–Hamburg railway
- Platforms: 2

Other information
- Fare zone: VBN: 530

Services
Preceding station	Bremen S-Bahn	Following station
Syke towards Bremerhaven-Lehe	RS2	Bassum towards Twistringen
Location

Bramstedt bei Syke (German: Bahnhof Bramstedt) is a railway station located in Bassum, Germany. The station is located on the Wanne-Eickel–Hamburg railway. The train services are operated by NordWestBahn. The station has been part of the Bremen S-Bahn since December 2010.

== Train services ==
The following services currently call at the station:

- Bremen S-Bahn services RS2 Bremerhaven-Lehe - Osterholz-Scharmbeck - Bremen - Twistringen
