= Sigolena of Albi =

French deaconess and saint

Saint Sigolena of Albi
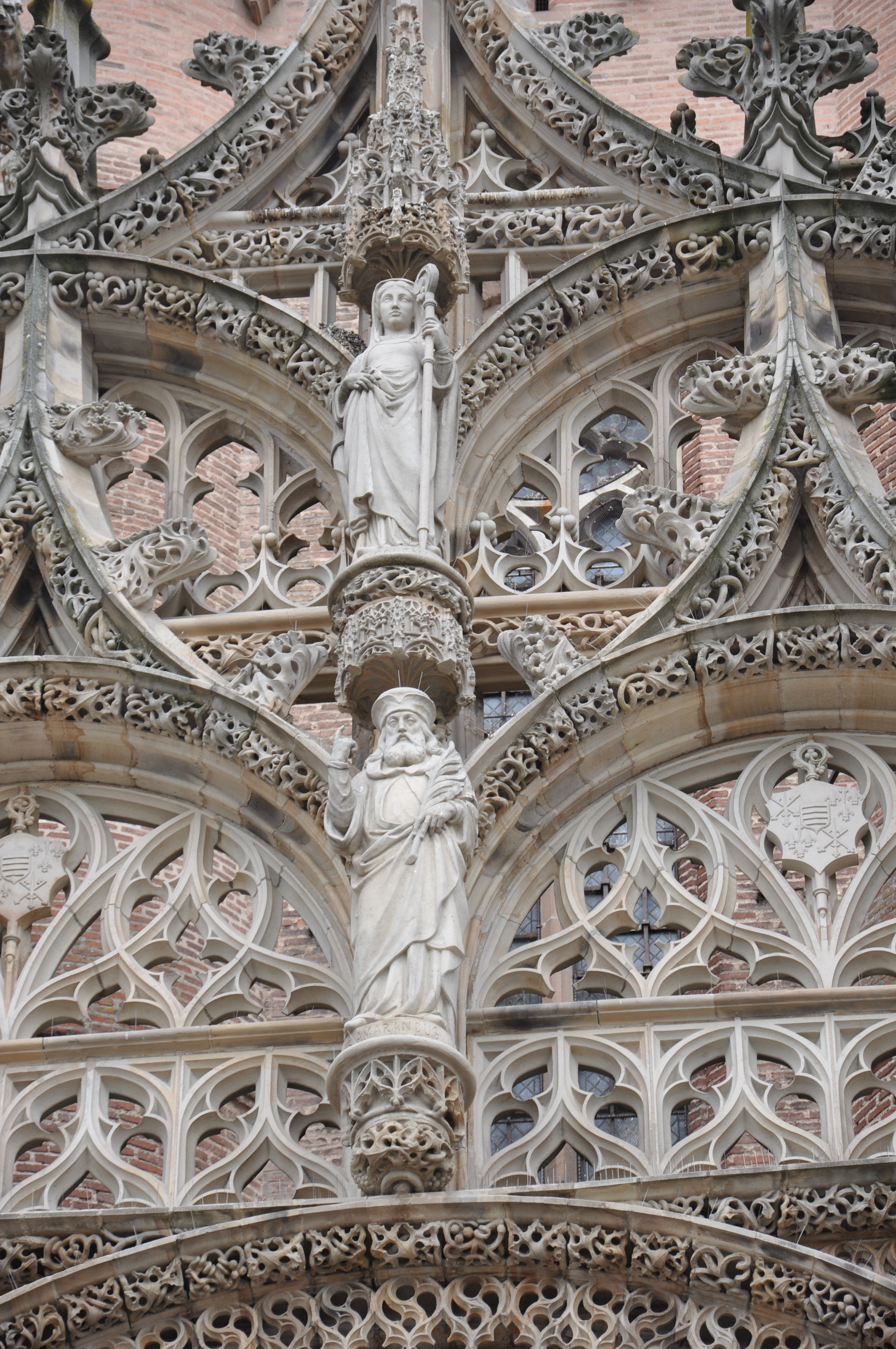
- Statue of St Sigolena the Deaconess (upper) on the South Portal of Albi Cathedral

Abbess of Troclar, Deaconess
- Born: 7th or 8th century
- Died: 769; Monastery of Troclar, France
- Venerated in: Catholic Church; Eastern Orthodox Church
- Major shrine: Albi Cathedral
- Feast: 24 July
- Attributes: Crosier
- Patronage: Albi, France

Saint Sigolena of Albi (fl. 7-8th. c.) was an Albigensian (Note: In this period, an Albigensian refers solely to one from the city of Albi. The heresy of Albigensianism would not arise until the 12th century.) deaconess and saint from Albi, France.

Sigolena was born into a noble family of Aquitaine.

Upon her marriage to Gislulf at the age of 12, she offered her husband all of her possessions to "gain the freedom of her body". Her husband granted her desire for a Josephite marriage and encouraged her piety and charity. After ten years of marriage her husband died unexpectedly. At age 24, she had difficulties convincing her parents she did not wish to remarry. After being consecrated by the city's bishop as a deaconess, she was eventually able to persuade her father to build her a convent on his own land.

She was initially buried at Insula.

Her church in Metz was situated near that of Saint Ferreolus of Besançon. Sigolena's biography was written by an anonymous author.

== Miracles ==
During her life on earth, the miracles attributed to her include the cleansing of 2 lepers, the healing of 3 blind people (including a priest), and at least 9 exorcisms. Upon her death, when the nuns removed her garments to wash her body, they reported that "a wonderful odour suddenly became sprinkled around that same place".

== Veneration ==
The relics of St Sigolena are in Albi Cathedral.

Her feast day is July 24.
