= Hans-Hermann Sprado =

German journalist and author (1956–2014)

Hans-Hermann "Hannes" Sprado (born 3 July 1956 in Bassum; died 24 July 2014) was a German journalist and author. Until his death he was editor-in-chief and publisher of the popular science magazine P.M. Magazin.

== Life ==
Sprado started his career as journalist with an editorial department traineeship at the Weser-Kurier in Bremen. Later he worked as editor for Bunte, Bild and the German Marie Claire. Since 1994 he worked for Gruner + Jahr. He became editor-in-chief of P.M. and also installed line extensions such as P.M. Biografie and P.M. History. Sprado also wrote novels and popular science books.

He lived with his family in Neubruchhausen near Bremen.

== Works ==
- Risse im Ruhm. Münster, Solibro, 2005, ISBN 978-3-932927-26-3
- Tod auf der Fashion Week. Münster, Solibro, 2007, ISBN 978-3-932927-39-3
- Das dunkle Ritual. Reinbek bei Hamburg, Rowohlt-Taschenbuch-Verlag, 2009, ISBN 978-3-499-24933-4
- Runengrab. Reinbek bei Hamburg, Rowohlt-Taschenbuch-Verlag, 2009, ISBN 978-3-499-24934-1
- Verfressen, sauschnell, unkaputtbar: Das phantastische Leben der Kakerlaken. Ullstein. Berlin, Ullstein, 2012, ISBN 978-3548374130
- Kalt kommt der Tod. Bremen, Edition Temmen, 2013, ISBN 978-3837870206
- Der Klang des Weltalls: Wie Planetentöne, heilige Klänge und die Musik der Natur heilen können. Arkana, 2014, ISBN 978-3442341368
