= Alan Waddell =

Australian writer

- Waddell in 2006
- Born: Alan Mossman Waddell; 24 July 1914; Hurstville, New South Wales, Australia
- Died: 2 September 2008 (aged 94); Royal North Shore Hospital
- Resting place: Northern Suburbs Crematorium, Sydney
- Occupation: Chartered accountant
- Years active: 2003–2008
- Spouse: Marjorie Eileen Hume
- Children: 3 sons
- Website: walksydneystreets.net

Alan Mossman Waddell (24 July 1914 – 2 September 2008) was an Australian walker who received national and international media attention for walking every street in over 280 suburbs in Sydney.

== Early life ==
Waddell was born on 24 July 1914, completed his schooling at Sydney Boys High School in 1931 and qualified as a chartered accountant. He served in the Citizen Military Forces during World War 2 and married Marjorie Eileen Hume on 30 May 1942.

== Walking ==
When Marjorie died in 2002, Waddell took up walking as a pastime and to combat aneurysms in his legs. After walking every street in his local suburb, he began to venture further in 2003. By 2004, he started to attract interest from the media. This led to further interest from radio and television. Over the next five years, he was a regular feature across print and electronic media. A list of all articles appears on his website.

By the time of his death in 2008, Waddell had walked 5000 kilometres and covered every street in 284 suburbs of Sydney. Over the years, his feat had been covered by media in many other countries, including China, South Africa, Thailand, the United Kingdom, and the United States.

== Awards and honours ==
In 2007 Waddell was presented with the Live Life award by the New South Wales government for promoting health and well-being. He was also an ambassador for the Heart Foundation and the Sydney Harbour Federation Trust.
