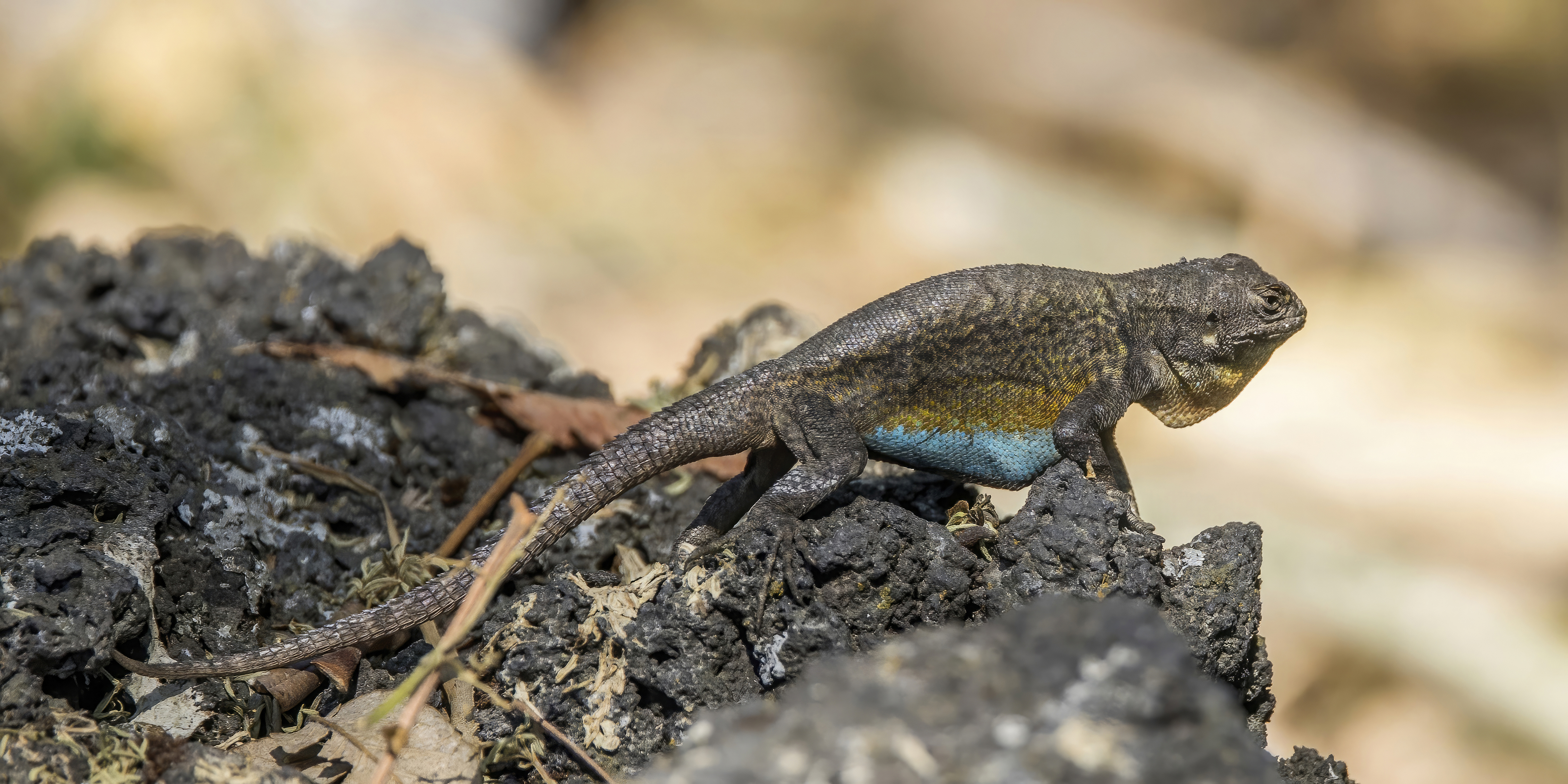
- male S. g. microlepidotus, Mexico

Conservation status
- Least Concern (IUCN 3.1)

- Secure (NatureServe)

Scientific classification
- Kingdom: Animalia
- Phylum: Chordata
- Class: Reptilia
- Order: Squamata
- Suborder: Iguania
- Family: Phrynosomatidae
- Genus: Sceloporus
- Species: S. grammicus

Binomial name
- Sceloporus grammicus Wiegmann, 1828

Synonyms
- Tropidurus grammicus – Wagler, 1830; Tropidolepis pleurostictus Gray, 1831; Tropidolepis grammicus – Gray, 1831; Sceloporus grammicus – Boulenger, 1885

= Sceloporus grammicus =

Species of lizard

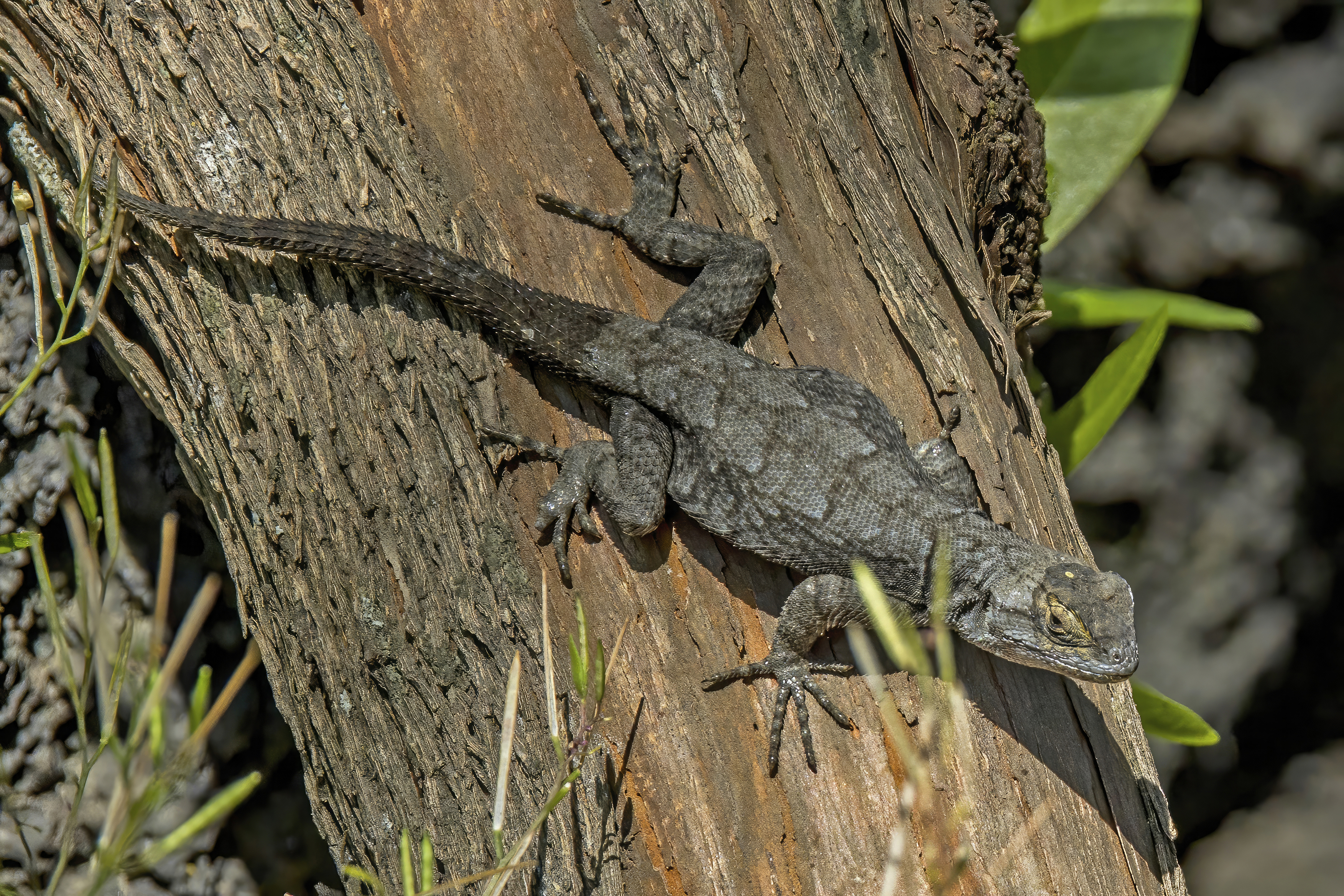
male S. g. microlepidotus, Mexico

Sceloporus grammicus is a species of lizard from Mexico and the southern United States. It is sometimes referred to as the mesquite lizard or graphic spiny lizard.

== Geographic range ==
Sceloporus grammicus is native to the southern United States in the state of Texas, and to Mexico in the states of Chihuahua, Durango, Zacatecas, Coahuila, San Luis Potosí, Nuevo León, Tamaulipas, Oaxaca, Guerrero, Querétaro, and Aguascalientes.

== Description ==
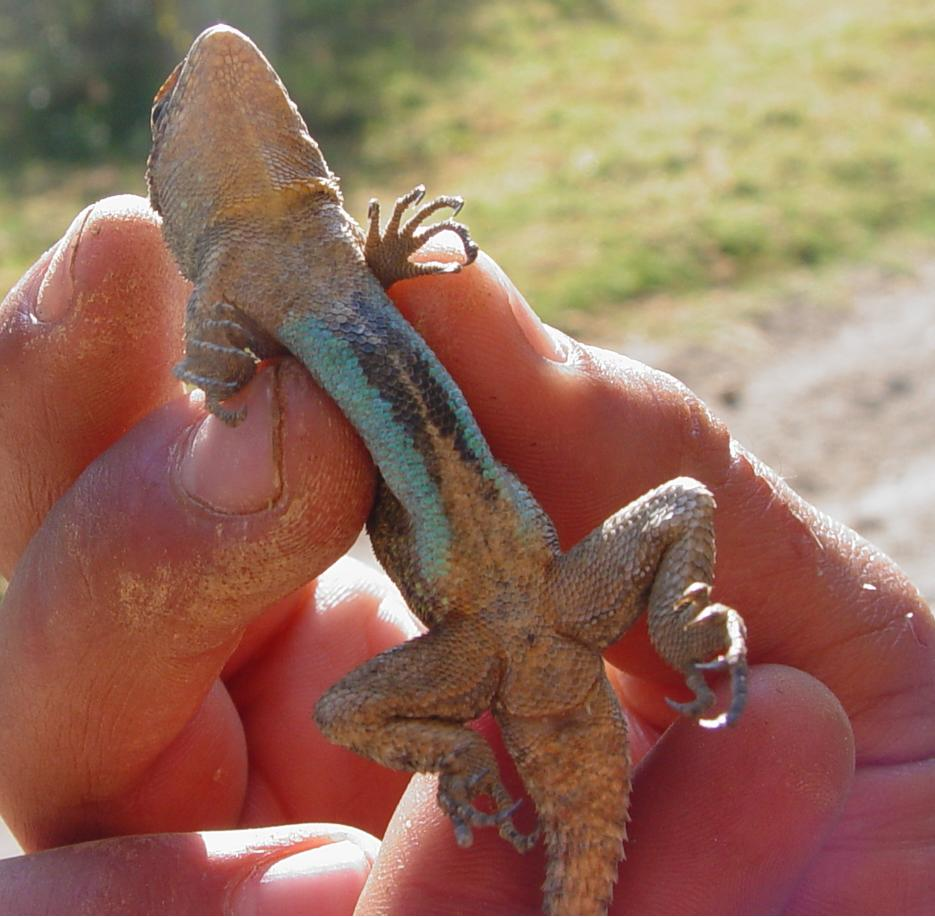
Mesquite lizard (Sceloporus grammicus) ventral view of a male

Sceloporus grammicus is a flat-bodied lizard with a tail that is slightly longer than head-body length. Adult total body length varies between 10 and 17.5 cm (3.9 and 6.9 in). The dorsum is mottled olive or gray and has a pattern consisting of 3–6 dark crossbars. The forelegs and tail have narrow crossbars. Males differ from females by having blue patches and black mottling on throat, a dark line on each shoulder, and blue patches on sides of belly, sometimes bordered in black.

== Reproduction ==
Sceloporus grammicus is viviparous. Litter size varies between 2 and 12. Females become sexually mature between 34 and 74 mm (1.3 and 2.9 in) in snout–vent length.

== Subspecies ==
There are four recognized subspecies of Sceloporus grammicus including the nominate race:

- Sceloporus grammicus disparilis Stejneger, 1916 — mesquite graphic lizard
- Sceloporus grammicus grammicus Wiegmann, 1828 — southern mesquite lizard
- Sceloporus grammicus microlepidotus Wiegmann, 1834 — northern mesquite lizard
- Sceloporus grammicus tamaulipensis Sites & Dixon, 1981 — Tamaulipas mesquite lizard
