= Frank Dietrich (politician) =

German politician

Frank Dietrich (3 May 1966 in Guben – 24 July 2011) was a German politician and member of the CDU. He was a member of the final East German Volkskammer (People's Chamber) before reunification and from 1990 to 1994 was a member of the Landtag of Brandenburg.
